

519001–519100 

|-bgcolor=#d6d6d6
| 519001 ||  || — || May 9, 2010 || WISE || WISE ||  || align=right | 3.4 km || 
|-id=002 bgcolor=#d6d6d6
| 519002 ||  || — || May 9, 2010 || WISE || WISE ||  || align=right | 3.8 km || 
|-id=003 bgcolor=#d6d6d6
| 519003 ||  || — || May 21, 2012 || Mount Lemmon || Mount Lemmon Survey ||  || align=right | 3.9 km || 
|-id=004 bgcolor=#d6d6d6
| 519004 ||  || — || May 10, 2010 || WISE || WISE ||  || align=right | 2.9 km || 
|-id=005 bgcolor=#d6d6d6
| 519005 ||  || — || May 10, 2010 || WISE || WISE ||  || align=right | 3.4 km || 
|-id=006 bgcolor=#E9E9E9
| 519006 ||  || — || May 10, 2010 || WISE || WISE ||  || align=right | 3.0 km || 
|-id=007 bgcolor=#d6d6d6
| 519007 ||  || — || May 11, 2010 || WISE || WISE ||  || align=right | 4.3 km || 
|-id=008 bgcolor=#d6d6d6
| 519008 ||  || — || May 15, 2009 || Kitt Peak || Spacewatch ||  || align=right | 4.0 km || 
|-id=009 bgcolor=#E9E9E9
| 519009 ||  || — || November 7, 2008 || Mount Lemmon || Mount Lemmon Survey ||  || align=right | 1.3 km || 
|-id=010 bgcolor=#d6d6d6
| 519010 ||  || — || September 11, 2007 || Catalina || CSS ||  || align=right | 4.3 km || 
|-id=011 bgcolor=#d6d6d6
| 519011 ||  || — || September 12, 2007 || Kitt Peak || Spacewatch ||  || align=right | 3.9 km || 
|-id=012 bgcolor=#d6d6d6
| 519012 ||  || — || May 24, 2006 || Mount Lemmon || Mount Lemmon Survey ||  || align=right | 3.2 km || 
|-id=013 bgcolor=#d6d6d6
| 519013 ||  || — || May 12, 2010 || WISE || WISE ||  || align=right | 3.9 km || 
|-id=014 bgcolor=#E9E9E9
| 519014 ||  || — || April 24, 2006 || Kitt Peak || Spacewatch ||  || align=right | 1.9 km || 
|-id=015 bgcolor=#d6d6d6
| 519015 ||  || — || April 1, 2008 || Catalina || CSS ||  || align=right | 5.2 km || 
|-id=016 bgcolor=#d6d6d6
| 519016 ||  || — || May 7, 2010 || Mount Lemmon || Mount Lemmon Survey ||  || align=right | 3.0 km || 
|-id=017 bgcolor=#d6d6d6
| 519017 ||  || — || April 1, 2005 || Kitt Peak || Spacewatch ||  || align=right | 2.5 km || 
|-id=018 bgcolor=#E9E9E9
| 519018 ||  || — || May 7, 2010 || Mount Lemmon || Mount Lemmon Survey ||  || align=right | 1.1 km || 
|-id=019 bgcolor=#E9E9E9
| 519019 ||  || — || February 15, 2010 || Catalina || CSS ||  || align=right | 2.4 km || 
|-id=020 bgcolor=#d6d6d6
| 519020 ||  || — || May 13, 2010 || WISE || WISE ||  || align=right | 3.2 km || 
|-id=021 bgcolor=#d6d6d6
| 519021 ||  || — || May 13, 2010 || WISE || WISE || Tj (2.98) || align=right | 2.4 km || 
|-id=022 bgcolor=#d6d6d6
| 519022 ||  || — || September 19, 2007 || Kitt Peak || Spacewatch ||  || align=right | 2.5 km || 
|-id=023 bgcolor=#E9E9E9
| 519023 ||  || — || May 14, 2010 || WISE || WISE ||  || align=right | 2.6 km || 
|-id=024 bgcolor=#d6d6d6
| 519024 ||  || — || December 1, 2008 || Kitt Peak || Spacewatch ||  || align=right | 3.2 km || 
|-id=025 bgcolor=#E9E9E9
| 519025 ||  || — || May 14, 2010 || WISE || WISE ||  || align=right | 2.9 km || 
|-id=026 bgcolor=#d6d6d6
| 519026 ||  || — || May 14, 2010 || WISE || WISE ||  || align=right | 2.2 km || 
|-id=027 bgcolor=#d6d6d6
| 519027 ||  || — || February 7, 2008 || Kitt Peak || Spacewatch ||  || align=right | 4.6 km || 
|-id=028 bgcolor=#d6d6d6
| 519028 ||  || — || September 9, 2007 || Kitt Peak || Spacewatch ||  || align=right | 4.5 km || 
|-id=029 bgcolor=#d6d6d6
| 519029 ||  || — || November 17, 2006 || Kitt Peak || Spacewatch ||  || align=right | 2.4 km || 
|-id=030 bgcolor=#d6d6d6
| 519030 ||  || — || March 10, 2005 || Kitt Peak || Spacewatch ||  || align=right | 3.5 km || 
|-id=031 bgcolor=#E9E9E9
| 519031 ||  || — || May 16, 2010 || WISE || WISE ||  || align=right | 2.0 km || 
|-id=032 bgcolor=#d6d6d6
| 519032 ||  || — || May 11, 2010 || Mount Lemmon || Mount Lemmon Survey ||  || align=right | 1.8 km || 
|-id=033 bgcolor=#E9E9E9
| 519033 ||  || — || May 11, 2010 || Mount Lemmon || Mount Lemmon Survey ||  || align=right | 1.3 km || 
|-id=034 bgcolor=#d6d6d6
| 519034 ||  || — || May 3, 2009 || Kitt Peak || Spacewatch ||  || align=right | 3.8 km || 
|-id=035 bgcolor=#d6d6d6
| 519035 ||  || — || May 16, 2010 || WISE || WISE || Tj (2.99) || align=right | 3.9 km || 
|-id=036 bgcolor=#d6d6d6
| 519036 ||  || — || May 17, 2010 || WISE || WISE ||  || align=right | 4.5 km || 
|-id=037 bgcolor=#d6d6d6
| 519037 ||  || — || May 16, 2010 || WISE || WISE ||  || align=right | 3.0 km || 
|-id=038 bgcolor=#d6d6d6
| 519038 ||  || — || May 16, 2010 || WISE || WISE || Tj (2.99) || align=right | 4.7 km || 
|-id=039 bgcolor=#d6d6d6
| 519039 ||  || — || May 17, 2010 || WISE || WISE ||  || align=right | 2.8 km || 
|-id=040 bgcolor=#d6d6d6
| 519040 ||  || — || March 31, 2009 || Mount Lemmon || Mount Lemmon Survey ||  || align=right | 3.1 km || 
|-id=041 bgcolor=#d6d6d6
| 519041 ||  || — || May 18, 2010 || WISE || WISE || Tj (2.97) || align=right | 3.3 km || 
|-id=042 bgcolor=#d6d6d6
| 519042 ||  || — || April 14, 2005 || Kitt Peak || Spacewatch ||  || align=right | 2.7 km || 
|-id=043 bgcolor=#d6d6d6
| 519043 ||  || — || February 9, 2008 || Mount Lemmon || Mount Lemmon Survey ||  || align=right | 3.3 km || 
|-id=044 bgcolor=#d6d6d6
| 519044 ||  || — || May 19, 2010 || WISE || WISE ||  || align=right | 2.2 km || 
|-id=045 bgcolor=#E9E9E9
| 519045 ||  || — || May 19, 2010 || WISE || WISE ||  || align=right | 1.9 km || 
|-id=046 bgcolor=#d6d6d6
| 519046 ||  || — || May 19, 2010 || WISE || WISE ||  || align=right | 3.1 km || 
|-id=047 bgcolor=#d6d6d6
| 519047 ||  || — || May 21, 2010 || WISE || WISE ||  || align=right | 3.9 km || 
|-id=048 bgcolor=#d6d6d6
| 519048 ||  || — || January 30, 2008 || Kitt Peak || Spacewatch ||  || align=right | 2.6 km || 
|-id=049 bgcolor=#d6d6d6
| 519049 ||  || — || October 1, 2005 || Mount Lemmon || Mount Lemmon Survey ||  || align=right | 2.9 km || 
|-id=050 bgcolor=#d6d6d6
| 519050 ||  || — || May 23, 2010 || WISE || WISE ||  || align=right | 3.3 km || 
|-id=051 bgcolor=#E9E9E9
| 519051 ||  || — || May 25, 2010 || WISE || WISE ||  || align=right | 2.1 km || 
|-id=052 bgcolor=#E9E9E9
| 519052 ||  || — || March 15, 2004 || Kitt Peak || Spacewatch ||  || align=right | 2.4 km || 
|-id=053 bgcolor=#E9E9E9
| 519053 ||  || — || May 26, 2010 || WISE || WISE ||  || align=right | 2.9 km || 
|-id=054 bgcolor=#d6d6d6
| 519054 ||  || — || September 12, 2007 || Mount Lemmon || Mount Lemmon Survey ||  || align=right | 4.5 km || 
|-id=055 bgcolor=#d6d6d6
| 519055 ||  || — || May 26, 2010 || WISE || WISE ||  || align=right | 4.1 km || 
|-id=056 bgcolor=#d6d6d6
| 519056 ||  || — || May 26, 2010 || WISE || WISE ||  || align=right | 2.5 km || 
|-id=057 bgcolor=#d6d6d6
| 519057 ||  || — || December 15, 2006 || Kitt Peak || Spacewatch ||  || align=right | 4.0 km || 
|-id=058 bgcolor=#d6d6d6
| 519058 ||  || — || May 27, 2010 || WISE || WISE ||  || align=right | 2.3 km || 
|-id=059 bgcolor=#E9E9E9
| 519059 ||  || — || March 4, 2010 || Catalina || CSS ||  || align=right | 2.2 km || 
|-id=060 bgcolor=#d6d6d6
| 519060 ||  || — || December 29, 2003 || Kitt Peak || Spacewatch ||  || align=right | 2.3 km || 
|-id=061 bgcolor=#d6d6d6
| 519061 ||  || — || May 29, 2010 || WISE || WISE ||  || align=right | 5.0 km || 
|-id=062 bgcolor=#d6d6d6
| 519062 ||  || — || May 29, 2010 || WISE || WISE ||  || align=right | 2.7 km || 
|-id=063 bgcolor=#fefefe
| 519063 ||  || — || October 18, 2004 || Kitt Peak || Spacewatch ||  || align=right | 2.7 km || 
|-id=064 bgcolor=#d6d6d6
| 519064 ||  || — || May 30, 2010 || WISE || WISE ||  || align=right | 3.2 km || 
|-id=065 bgcolor=#d6d6d6
| 519065 ||  || — || March 13, 2005 || Kitt Peak || Spacewatch ||  || align=right | 4.8 km || 
|-id=066 bgcolor=#d6d6d6
| 519066 ||  || — || May 30, 2010 || WISE || WISE ||  || align=right | 3.9 km || 
|-id=067 bgcolor=#d6d6d6
| 519067 ||  || — || May 30, 2010 || WISE || WISE ||  || align=right | 2.9 km || 
|-id=068 bgcolor=#d6d6d6
| 519068 ||  || — || June 1, 2010 || WISE || WISE ||  || align=right | 4.5 km || 
|-id=069 bgcolor=#d6d6d6
| 519069 ||  || — || June 1, 2010 || Catalina || CSS ||  || align=right | 4.1 km || 
|-id=070 bgcolor=#d6d6d6
| 519070 ||  || — || June 1, 2010 || WISE || WISE ||  || align=right | 2.9 km || 
|-id=071 bgcolor=#d6d6d6
| 519071 ||  || — || March 20, 2010 || Mount Lemmon || Mount Lemmon Survey ||  || align=right | 2.3 km || 
|-id=072 bgcolor=#d6d6d6
| 519072 ||  || — || June 2, 2010 || WISE || WISE ||  || align=right | 2.8 km || 
|-id=073 bgcolor=#d6d6d6
| 519073 ||  || — || November 8, 2013 || Kitt Peak || Spacewatch ||  || align=right | 2.8 km || 
|-id=074 bgcolor=#d6d6d6
| 519074 ||  || — || June 3, 2010 || WISE || WISE ||  || align=right | 3.1 km || 
|-id=075 bgcolor=#d6d6d6
| 519075 ||  || — || June 3, 2010 || WISE || WISE || 7:4 || align=right | 4.2 km || 
|-id=076 bgcolor=#E9E9E9
| 519076 ||  || — || June 4, 2010 || WISE || WISE ||  || align=right | 2.8 km || 
|-id=077 bgcolor=#d6d6d6
| 519077 ||  || — || June 5, 2010 || WISE || WISE ||  || align=right | 3.5 km || 
|-id=078 bgcolor=#d6d6d6
| 519078 ||  || — || June 5, 2010 || WISE || WISE ||  || align=right | 2.6 km || 
|-id=079 bgcolor=#d6d6d6
| 519079 ||  || — || June 6, 2010 || WISE || WISE ||  || align=right | 4.2 km || 
|-id=080 bgcolor=#d6d6d6
| 519080 ||  || — || October 28, 2008 || Catalina || CSS || Tj (2.99) || align=right | 5.1 km || 
|-id=081 bgcolor=#E9E9E9
| 519081 ||  || — || November 20, 2008 || Kitt Peak || Spacewatch ||  || align=right | 2.6 km || 
|-id=082 bgcolor=#d6d6d6
| 519082 ||  || — || December 1, 2006 || Kitt Peak || Spacewatch ||  || align=right | 3.7 km || 
|-id=083 bgcolor=#d6d6d6
| 519083 ||  || — || November 1, 2005 || Catalina || CSS ||  || align=right | 3.2 km || 
|-id=084 bgcolor=#d6d6d6
| 519084 ||  || — || November 1, 2005 || Mount Lemmon || Mount Lemmon Survey ||  || align=right | 2.7 km || 
|-id=085 bgcolor=#d6d6d6
| 519085 ||  || — || June 9, 2010 || WISE || WISE ||  || align=right | 4.3 km || 
|-id=086 bgcolor=#d6d6d6
| 519086 ||  || — || October 29, 2005 || Kitt Peak || Spacewatch ||  || align=right | 3.0 km || 
|-id=087 bgcolor=#E9E9E9
| 519087 ||  || — || February 16, 2010 || Kitt Peak || Spacewatch ||  || align=right | 2.4 km || 
|-id=088 bgcolor=#E9E9E9
| 519088 ||  || — || October 7, 2008 || Kitt Peak || Spacewatch ||  || align=right | 2.1 km || 
|-id=089 bgcolor=#d6d6d6
| 519089 ||  || — || February 16, 2010 || Kitt Peak || Spacewatch ||  || align=right | 2.9 km || 
|-id=090 bgcolor=#d6d6d6
| 519090 ||  || — || March 15, 2010 || Catalina || CSS ||  || align=right | 3.8 km || 
|-id=091 bgcolor=#d6d6d6
| 519091 ||  || — || April 8, 2010 || Mount Lemmon || Mount Lemmon Survey || Tj (2.99) || align=right | 4.0 km || 
|-id=092 bgcolor=#d6d6d6
| 519092 ||  || — || June 11, 2010 || WISE || WISE ||  || align=right | 3.9 km || 
|-id=093 bgcolor=#d6d6d6
| 519093 ||  || — || March 20, 2010 || Mount Lemmon || Mount Lemmon Survey ||  || align=right | 3.2 km || 
|-id=094 bgcolor=#d6d6d6
| 519094 ||  || — || October 1, 2005 || Catalina || CSS ||  || align=right | 5.0 km || 
|-id=095 bgcolor=#d6d6d6
| 519095 ||  || — || June 12, 2010 || WISE || WISE ||  || align=right | 3.0 km || 
|-id=096 bgcolor=#d6d6d6
| 519096 ||  || — || December 5, 2008 || Kitt Peak || Spacewatch ||  || align=right | 3.1 km || 
|-id=097 bgcolor=#E9E9E9
| 519097 ||  || — || March 20, 2010 || Mount Lemmon || Mount Lemmon Survey ||  || align=right | 2.8 km || 
|-id=098 bgcolor=#E9E9E9
| 519098 ||  || — || February 2, 2008 || Kitt Peak || Spacewatch ||  || align=right | 1.8 km || 
|-id=099 bgcolor=#d6d6d6
| 519099 ||  || — || June 13, 2010 || WISE || WISE ||  || align=right | 3.3 km || 
|-id=100 bgcolor=#d6d6d6
| 519100 ||  || — || June 13, 2010 || WISE || WISE ||  || align=right | 3.2 km || 
|}

519101–519200 

|-bgcolor=#d6d6d6
| 519101 ||  || — || June 13, 2010 || WISE || WISE ||  || align=right | 4.8 km || 
|-id=102 bgcolor=#d6d6d6
| 519102 ||  || — || June 14, 2010 || WISE || WISE ||  || align=right | 2.7 km || 
|-id=103 bgcolor=#d6d6d6
| 519103 ||  || — || February 13, 2007 || Mount Lemmon || Mount Lemmon Survey ||  || align=right | 3.5 km || 
|-id=104 bgcolor=#d6d6d6
| 519104 ||  || — || March 18, 2010 || Kitt Peak || Spacewatch ||  || align=right | 3.5 km || 
|-id=105 bgcolor=#d6d6d6
| 519105 ||  || — || March 12, 2008 || Kitt Peak || Spacewatch ||  || align=right | 4.1 km || 
|-id=106 bgcolor=#d6d6d6
| 519106 ||  || — || February 14, 2010 || Kitt Peak || Spacewatch ||  || align=right | 2.4 km || 
|-id=107 bgcolor=#d6d6d6
| 519107 ||  || — || June 18, 2010 || Mount Lemmon || Mount Lemmon Survey ||  || align=right | 2.4 km || 
|-id=108 bgcolor=#E9E9E9
| 519108 ||  || — || June 22, 2010 || Nogales || Tenagra II Obs. ||  || align=right data-sort-value="0.90" | 900 m || 
|-id=109 bgcolor=#d6d6d6
| 519109 ||  || — || June 16, 2010 || WISE || WISE ||  || align=right | 2.9 km || 
|-id=110 bgcolor=#d6d6d6
| 519110 ||  || — || June 16, 2010 || WISE || WISE ||  || align=right | 2.5 km || 
|-id=111 bgcolor=#E9E9E9
| 519111 ||  || — || June 17, 2010 || WISE || WISE ||  || align=right | 2.1 km || 
|-id=112 bgcolor=#d6d6d6
| 519112 ||  || — || February 22, 2004 || Kitt Peak || Spacewatch ||  || align=right | 3.4 km || 
|-id=113 bgcolor=#d6d6d6
| 519113 ||  || — || February 10, 2008 || Kitt Peak || Spacewatch ||  || align=right | 4.0 km || 
|-id=114 bgcolor=#d6d6d6
| 519114 ||  || — || June 18, 2010 || WISE || WISE ||  || align=right | 4.7 km || 
|-id=115 bgcolor=#d6d6d6
| 519115 ||  || — || June 19, 2010 || WISE || WISE ||  || align=right | 3.0 km || 
|-id=116 bgcolor=#d6d6d6
| 519116 ||  || — || June 19, 2010 || WISE || WISE ||  || align=right | 2.2 km || 
|-id=117 bgcolor=#d6d6d6
| 519117 ||  || — || June 20, 2010 || WISE || WISE ||  || align=right | 2.2 km || 
|-id=118 bgcolor=#d6d6d6
| 519118 ||  || — || December 13, 2006 || Mount Lemmon || Mount Lemmon Survey ||  || align=right | 4.2 km || 
|-id=119 bgcolor=#E9E9E9
| 519119 ||  || — || June 21, 2010 || WISE || WISE ||  || align=right | 2.2 km || 
|-id=120 bgcolor=#d6d6d6
| 519120 ||  || — || March 20, 2010 || Catalina || CSS ||  || align=right | 5.0 km || 
|-id=121 bgcolor=#d6d6d6
| 519121 ||  || — || August 6, 2004 || Campo Imperatore || CINEOS ||  || align=right | 2.5 km || 
|-id=122 bgcolor=#E9E9E9
| 519122 ||  || — || October 25, 2008 || Kitt Peak || Spacewatch ||  || align=right | 2.5 km || 
|-id=123 bgcolor=#d6d6d6
| 519123 ||  || — || September 18, 2006 || Kitt Peak || Spacewatch ||  || align=right | 2.7 km || 
|-id=124 bgcolor=#d6d6d6
| 519124 ||  || — || April 17, 2005 || Kitt Peak || Spacewatch ||  || align=right | 2.1 km || 
|-id=125 bgcolor=#E9E9E9
| 519125 ||  || — || June 23, 2010 || WISE || WISE ||  || align=right | 1.5 km || 
|-id=126 bgcolor=#d6d6d6
| 519126 ||  || — || December 21, 2008 || Mount Lemmon || Mount Lemmon Survey ||  || align=right | 3.5 km || 
|-id=127 bgcolor=#d6d6d6
| 519127 ||  || — || December 1, 2008 || Kitt Peak || Spacewatch ||  || align=right | 3.8 km || 
|-id=128 bgcolor=#d6d6d6
| 519128 ||  || — || June 1, 2005 || Kitt Peak || Spacewatch ||  || align=right | 3.9 km || 
|-id=129 bgcolor=#E9E9E9
| 519129 ||  || — || June 24, 2010 || WISE || WISE ||  || align=right | 2.2 km || 
|-id=130 bgcolor=#d6d6d6
| 519130 ||  || — || June 25, 2010 || WISE || WISE ||  || align=right | 4.0 km || 
|-id=131 bgcolor=#E9E9E9
| 519131 ||  || — || June 26, 2010 || WISE || WISE ||  || align=right | 2.3 km || 
|-id=132 bgcolor=#d6d6d6
| 519132 ||  || — || June 27, 2010 || WISE || WISE ||  || align=right | 2.4 km || 
|-id=133 bgcolor=#d6d6d6
| 519133 ||  || — || December 7, 2012 || Mount Lemmon || Mount Lemmon Survey ||  || align=right | 4.4 km || 
|-id=134 bgcolor=#E9E9E9
| 519134 ||  || — || June 27, 2010 || WISE || WISE ||  || align=right | 1.9 km || 
|-id=135 bgcolor=#d6d6d6
| 519135 ||  || — || June 28, 2010 || WISE || WISE ||  || align=right | 3.1 km || 
|-id=136 bgcolor=#E9E9E9
| 519136 ||  || — || January 11, 2008 || Kitt Peak || Spacewatch ||  || align=right | 2.2 km || 
|-id=137 bgcolor=#d6d6d6
| 519137 ||  || — || June 29, 2010 || WISE || WISE ||  || align=right | 4.0 km || 
|-id=138 bgcolor=#d6d6d6
| 519138 ||  || — || March 12, 2005 || Kitt Peak || Spacewatch ||  || align=right | 1.9 km || 
|-id=139 bgcolor=#E9E9E9
| 519139 ||  || — || April 19, 2009 || Kitt Peak || Spacewatch || critical || align=right | 2.1 km || 
|-id=140 bgcolor=#d6d6d6
| 519140 ||  || — || June 20, 2010 || Mount Lemmon || Mount Lemmon Survey ||  || align=right | 2.9 km || 
|-id=141 bgcolor=#E9E9E9
| 519141 ||  || — || November 3, 2007 || Kitt Peak || Spacewatch ||  || align=right | 1.8 km || 
|-id=142 bgcolor=#d6d6d6
| 519142 ||  || — || October 19, 2006 || Kitt Peak || Spacewatch ||  || align=right | 2.5 km || 
|-id=143 bgcolor=#d6d6d6
| 519143 ||  || — || October 3, 2006 || Mount Lemmon || Mount Lemmon Survey ||  || align=right | 3.7 km || 
|-id=144 bgcolor=#d6d6d6
| 519144 ||  || — || July 5, 2010 || WISE || WISE ||  || align=right | 4.2 km || 
|-id=145 bgcolor=#d6d6d6
| 519145 ||  || — || March 19, 2010 || Kitt Peak || Spacewatch ||  || align=right | 3.3 km || 
|-id=146 bgcolor=#E9E9E9
| 519146 ||  || — || May 6, 2006 || Kitt Peak || Spacewatch ||  || align=right | 1.6 km || 
|-id=147 bgcolor=#d6d6d6
| 519147 ||  || — || July 6, 2010 || WISE || WISE ||  || align=right | 2.0 km || 
|-id=148 bgcolor=#E9E9E9
| 519148 ||  || — || March 17, 2010 || Kitt Peak || Spacewatch ||  || align=right | 1.2 km || 
|-id=149 bgcolor=#d6d6d6
| 519149 ||  || — || July 9, 2010 || WISE || WISE ||  || align=right | 3.6 km || 
|-id=150 bgcolor=#d6d6d6
| 519150 ||  || — || July 9, 2010 || WISE || WISE ||  || align=right | 4.5 km || 
|-id=151 bgcolor=#d6d6d6
| 519151 ||  || — || July 9, 2010 || WISE || WISE ||  || align=right | 2.5 km || 
|-id=152 bgcolor=#d6d6d6
| 519152 ||  || — || February 10, 2007 || Mount Lemmon || Mount Lemmon Survey ||  || align=right | 2.7 km || 
|-id=153 bgcolor=#d6d6d6
| 519153 ||  || — || July 9, 2010 || WISE || WISE ||  || align=right | 4.1 km || 
|-id=154 bgcolor=#d6d6d6
| 519154 ||  || — || July 9, 2010 || WISE || WISE ||  || align=right | 2.6 km || 
|-id=155 bgcolor=#E9E9E9
| 519155 ||  || — || December 15, 2007 || Kitt Peak || Spacewatch ||  || align=right | 3.4 km || 
|-id=156 bgcolor=#d6d6d6
| 519156 ||  || — || January 15, 2009 || Kitt Peak || Spacewatch ||  || align=right | 2.6 km || 
|-id=157 bgcolor=#d6d6d6
| 519157 ||  || — || July 15, 2010 || WISE || WISE || Tj (2.99) || align=right | 2.0 km || 
|-id=158 bgcolor=#E9E9E9
| 519158 ||  || — || July 15, 2010 || WISE || WISE ||  || align=right | 1.3 km || 
|-id=159 bgcolor=#E9E9E9
| 519159 ||  || — || July 2, 2010 || WISE || WISE ||  || align=right | 1.8 km || 
|-id=160 bgcolor=#d6d6d6
| 519160 ||  || — || December 2, 2005 || Kitt Peak || Spacewatch ||  || align=right | 4.6 km || 
|-id=161 bgcolor=#d6d6d6
| 519161 ||  || — || July 12, 2010 || WISE || WISE ||  || align=right | 3.3 km || 
|-id=162 bgcolor=#d6d6d6
| 519162 ||  || — || July 12, 2010 || WISE || WISE ||  || align=right | 3.5 km || 
|-id=163 bgcolor=#d6d6d6
| 519163 ||  || — || July 12, 2010 || WISE || WISE ||  || align=right | 3.2 km || 
|-id=164 bgcolor=#d6d6d6
| 519164 ||  || — || July 12, 2010 || WISE || WISE ||  || align=right | 2.7 km || 
|-id=165 bgcolor=#d6d6d6
| 519165 ||  || — || July 13, 2010 || WISE || WISE ||  || align=right | 2.4 km || 
|-id=166 bgcolor=#d6d6d6
| 519166 ||  || — || April 29, 2010 || WISE || WISE ||  || align=right | 3.4 km || 
|-id=167 bgcolor=#d6d6d6
| 519167 ||  || — || July 16, 2010 || WISE || WISE ||  || align=right | 2.3 km || 
|-id=168 bgcolor=#d6d6d6
| 519168 ||  || — || July 16, 2010 || WISE || WISE ||  || align=right | 2.9 km || 
|-id=169 bgcolor=#d6d6d6
| 519169 ||  || — || June 17, 2010 || Mount Lemmon || Mount Lemmon Survey ||  || align=right | 4.2 km || 
|-id=170 bgcolor=#d6d6d6
| 519170 ||  || — || July 18, 2010 || WISE || WISE ||  || align=right | 3.1 km || 
|-id=171 bgcolor=#d6d6d6
| 519171 ||  || — || February 17, 2007 || Kitt Peak || Spacewatch ||  || align=right | 3.0 km || 
|-id=172 bgcolor=#d6d6d6
| 519172 ||  || — || November 22, 2005 || Kitt Peak || Spacewatch ||  || align=right | 2.4 km || 
|-id=173 bgcolor=#d6d6d6
| 519173 ||  || — || July 23, 2010 || WISE || WISE ||  || align=right | 2.5 km || 
|-id=174 bgcolor=#E9E9E9
| 519174 ||  || — || July 24, 2010 || WISE || WISE ||  || align=right | 2.9 km || 
|-id=175 bgcolor=#E9E9E9
| 519175 ||  || — || May 9, 2006 || Mount Lemmon || Mount Lemmon Survey ||  || align=right | 2.0 km || 
|-id=176 bgcolor=#d6d6d6
| 519176 ||  || — || April 9, 2010 || Kitt Peak || Spacewatch ||  || align=right | 2.9 km || 
|-id=177 bgcolor=#d6d6d6
| 519177 ||  || — || September 12, 2004 || Kitt Peak || Spacewatch ||  || align=right | 2.3 km || 
|-id=178 bgcolor=#d6d6d6
| 519178 ||  || — || August 23, 2004 || Kitt Peak || Spacewatch ||  || align=right | 3.0 km || 
|-id=179 bgcolor=#d6d6d6
| 519179 ||  || — || April 30, 2008 || Kitt Peak || Spacewatch ||  || align=right | 3.5 km || 
|-id=180 bgcolor=#d6d6d6
| 519180 ||  || — || July 28, 2010 || WISE || WISE ||  || align=right | 4.4 km || 
|-id=181 bgcolor=#d6d6d6
| 519181 ||  || — || July 29, 2010 || WISE || WISE ||  || align=right | 2.9 km || 
|-id=182 bgcolor=#E9E9E9
| 519182 ||  || — || July 30, 2010 || WISE || WISE ||  || align=right | 2.5 km || 
|-id=183 bgcolor=#fefefe
| 519183 ||  || — || April 16, 2005 || Kitt Peak || Spacewatch ||  || align=right data-sort-value="0.80" | 800 m || 
|-id=184 bgcolor=#d6d6d6
| 519184 ||  || — || July 30, 2010 || WISE || WISE ||  || align=right | 3.0 km || 
|-id=185 bgcolor=#d6d6d6
| 519185 ||  || — || February 2, 2001 || Kitt Peak || Spacewatch ||  || align=right | 2.8 km || 
|-id=186 bgcolor=#d6d6d6
| 519186 ||  || — || May 12, 2010 || Mount Lemmon || Mount Lemmon Survey ||  || align=right | 3.4 km || 
|-id=187 bgcolor=#E9E9E9
| 519187 ||  || — || February 7, 2008 || Kitt Peak || Spacewatch ||  || align=right | 2.1 km || 
|-id=188 bgcolor=#d6d6d6
| 519188 ||  || — || August 1, 2010 || WISE || WISE ||  || align=right | 4.6 km || 
|-id=189 bgcolor=#d6d6d6
| 519189 ||  || — || August 28, 2006 || Kitt Peak || Spacewatch ||  || align=right | 3.9 km || 
|-id=190 bgcolor=#d6d6d6
| 519190 ||  || — || August 4, 2010 || WISE || WISE ||  || align=right | 1.7 km || 
|-id=191 bgcolor=#d6d6d6
| 519191 ||  || — || August 4, 2010 || WISE || WISE ||  || align=right | 3.9 km || 
|-id=192 bgcolor=#E9E9E9
| 519192 ||  || — || August 5, 2010 || WISE || WISE ||  || align=right | 2.4 km || 
|-id=193 bgcolor=#E9E9E9
| 519193 ||  || — || May 14, 2010 || Mount Lemmon || Mount Lemmon Survey ||  || align=right | 1.9 km || 
|-id=194 bgcolor=#E9E9E9
| 519194 ||  || — || February 12, 2010 || WISE || WISE ||  || align=right | 2.6 km || 
|-id=195 bgcolor=#E9E9E9
| 519195 ||  || — || January 29, 2010 || WISE || WISE ||  || align=right | 1.5 km || 
|-id=196 bgcolor=#d6d6d6
| 519196 ||  || — || January 19, 2015 || Mount Lemmon || Mount Lemmon Survey ||  || align=right | 3.7 km || 
|-id=197 bgcolor=#E9E9E9
| 519197 ||  || — || August 10, 2010 || XuYi || PMO NEO ||  || align=right | 1.4 km || 
|-id=198 bgcolor=#FA8072
| 519198 ||  || — || August 13, 2010 || WISE || WISE ||  || align=right | 2.3 km || 
|-id=199 bgcolor=#d6d6d6
| 519199 ||  || — || September 25, 2006 || Kitt Peak || Spacewatch ||  || align=right | 3.3 km || 
|-id=200 bgcolor=#d6d6d6
| 519200 ||  || — || August 12, 2010 || Kitt Peak || Spacewatch ||  || align=right | 2.4 km || 
|}

519201–519300 

|-bgcolor=#d6d6d6
| 519201 ||  || — || August 12, 2010 || Kitt Peak || Spacewatch ||  || align=right | 2.4 km || 
|-id=202 bgcolor=#E9E9E9
| 519202 ||  || — || August 4, 2010 || La Sagra || OAM Obs. || JUN || align=right data-sort-value="0.98" | 980 m || 
|-id=203 bgcolor=#d6d6d6
| 519203 ||  || — || August 12, 2010 || Kitt Peak || Spacewatch ||  || align=right | 2.6 km || 
|-id=204 bgcolor=#E9E9E9
| 519204 ||  || — || September 3, 2010 || La Sagra || OAM Obs. ||  || align=right | 1.5 km || 
|-id=205 bgcolor=#d6d6d6
| 519205 ||  || — || September 10, 2010 || Kitt Peak || Spacewatch ||  || align=right | 2.3 km || 
|-id=206 bgcolor=#d6d6d6
| 519206 ||  || — || September 10, 2010 || Mount Lemmon || Mount Lemmon Survey ||  || align=right | 3.0 km || 
|-id=207 bgcolor=#E9E9E9
| 519207 ||  || — || October 13, 2006 || Kitt Peak || Spacewatch ||  || align=right | 1.2 km || 
|-id=208 bgcolor=#d6d6d6
| 519208 ||  || — || April 6, 2008 || Kitt Peak || Spacewatch ||  || align=right | 2.8 km || 
|-id=209 bgcolor=#fefefe
| 519209 ||  || — || September 17, 2006 || Kitt Peak || Spacewatch ||  || align=right data-sort-value="0.77" | 770 m || 
|-id=210 bgcolor=#d6d6d6
| 519210 ||  || — || September 16, 2010 || Kitt Peak || Spacewatch ||  || align=right | 2.9 km || 
|-id=211 bgcolor=#d6d6d6
| 519211 ||  || — || November 3, 2005 || Kitt Peak || Spacewatch ||  || align=right | 2.3 km || 
|-id=212 bgcolor=#E9E9E9
| 519212 ||  || — || October 19, 2006 || Kitt Peak || Spacewatch ||  || align=right | 1.2 km || 
|-id=213 bgcolor=#E9E9E9
| 519213 ||  || — || June 23, 2010 || WISE || WISE ||  || align=right | 1.7 km || 
|-id=214 bgcolor=#d6d6d6
| 519214 ||  || — || September 30, 2010 || Mount Lemmon || Mount Lemmon Survey ||  || align=right | 2.8 km || 
|-id=215 bgcolor=#E9E9E9
| 519215 ||  || — || October 11, 2010 || Mount Lemmon || Mount Lemmon Survey ||  || align=right | 2.0 km || 
|-id=216 bgcolor=#d6d6d6
| 519216 ||  || — || April 6, 2008 || Kitt Peak || Spacewatch ||  || align=right | 3.0 km || 
|-id=217 bgcolor=#d6d6d6
| 519217 ||  || — || October 1, 2010 || Mount Lemmon || Mount Lemmon Survey ||  || align=right | 3.0 km || 
|-id=218 bgcolor=#d6d6d6
| 519218 ||  || — || March 29, 2008 || Kitt Peak || Spacewatch ||  || align=right | 2.3 km || 
|-id=219 bgcolor=#fefefe
| 519219 ||  || — || October 12, 2010 || Mount Lemmon || Mount Lemmon Survey ||  || align=right data-sort-value="0.94" | 940 m || 
|-id=220 bgcolor=#fefefe
| 519220 ||  || — || October 13, 2010 || Mount Lemmon || Mount Lemmon Survey ||  || align=right data-sort-value="0.55" | 550 m || 
|-id=221 bgcolor=#d6d6d6
| 519221 ||  || — || October 28, 2010 || Mount Lemmon || Mount Lemmon Survey ||  || align=right | 2.2 km || 
|-id=222 bgcolor=#d6d6d6
| 519222 ||  || — || October 28, 2010 || Mount Lemmon || Mount Lemmon Survey ||  || align=right | 3.3 km || 
|-id=223 bgcolor=#fefefe
| 519223 ||  || — || September 23, 2006 || Kitt Peak || Spacewatch ||  || align=right data-sort-value="0.78" | 780 m || 
|-id=224 bgcolor=#d6d6d6
| 519224 ||  || — || October 31, 2010 || Mount Lemmon || Mount Lemmon Survey ||  || align=right | 4.4 km || 
|-id=225 bgcolor=#d6d6d6
| 519225 ||  || — || November 1, 2010 || Kitt Peak || Spacewatch ||  || align=right | 3.7 km || 
|-id=226 bgcolor=#d6d6d6
| 519226 ||  || — || December 21, 2006 || Kitt Peak || Spacewatch ||  || align=right | 3.0 km || 
|-id=227 bgcolor=#E9E9E9
| 519227 ||  || — || November 5, 2010 || Kitt Peak || Spacewatch ||  || align=right | 1.5 km || 
|-id=228 bgcolor=#E9E9E9
| 519228 ||  || — || October 11, 2010 || Mount Lemmon || Mount Lemmon Survey ||  || align=right | 2.2 km || 
|-id=229 bgcolor=#E9E9E9
| 519229 ||  || — || March 5, 2008 || Kitt Peak || Spacewatch ||  || align=right | 1.8 km || 
|-id=230 bgcolor=#d6d6d6
| 519230 ||  || — || October 29, 2010 || Mount Lemmon || Mount Lemmon Survey ||  || align=right | 2.2 km || 
|-id=231 bgcolor=#d6d6d6
| 519231 ||  || — || September 5, 2010 || Mount Lemmon || Mount Lemmon Survey ||  || align=right | 2.4 km || 
|-id=232 bgcolor=#d6d6d6
| 519232 ||  || — || November 12, 2010 || Kitt Peak || Spacewatch ||  || align=right | 2.5 km || 
|-id=233 bgcolor=#E9E9E9
| 519233 ||  || — || November 13, 2010 || Mount Lemmon || Mount Lemmon Survey ||  || align=right data-sort-value="0.75" | 750 m || 
|-id=234 bgcolor=#E9E9E9
| 519234 ||  || — || November 1, 2010 || Kitt Peak || Spacewatch ||  || align=right | 1.5 km || 
|-id=235 bgcolor=#E9E9E9
| 519235 ||  || — || November 1, 2010 || Mount Lemmon || Mount Lemmon Survey ||  || align=right | 2.7 km || 
|-id=236 bgcolor=#d6d6d6
| 519236 ||  || — || March 28, 2008 || Kitt Peak || Spacewatch ||  || align=right | 2.2 km || 
|-id=237 bgcolor=#fefefe
| 519237 ||  || — || December 14, 1995 || Kitt Peak || Spacewatch ||  || align=right data-sort-value="0.94" | 940 m || 
|-id=238 bgcolor=#E9E9E9
| 519238 ||  || — || January 10, 2007 || Kitt Peak || Spacewatch ||  || align=right | 2.6 km || 
|-id=239 bgcolor=#fefefe
| 519239 ||  || — || November 7, 2010 || Mount Lemmon || Mount Lemmon Survey ||  || align=right data-sort-value="0.72" | 720 m || 
|-id=240 bgcolor=#E9E9E9
| 519240 ||  || — || January 25, 2007 || Kitt Peak || Spacewatch ||  || align=right | 2.0 km || 
|-id=241 bgcolor=#E9E9E9
| 519241 ||  || — || November 2, 2010 || Kitt Peak || Spacewatch ||  || align=right | 1.4 km || 
|-id=242 bgcolor=#E9E9E9
| 519242 ||  || — || November 22, 2006 || Kitt Peak || Spacewatch ||  || align=right data-sort-value="0.84" | 840 m || 
|-id=243 bgcolor=#E9E9E9
| 519243 ||  || — || March 7, 2008 || Mount Lemmon || Mount Lemmon Survey ||  || align=right | 1.6 km || 
|-id=244 bgcolor=#E9E9E9
| 519244 ||  || — || December 24, 2006 || Kitt Peak || Spacewatch ||  || align=right | 1.2 km || 
|-id=245 bgcolor=#d6d6d6
| 519245 ||  || — || November 26, 2010 || Mount Lemmon || Mount Lemmon Survey ||  || align=right | 2.9 km || 
|-id=246 bgcolor=#d6d6d6
| 519246 ||  || — || December 14, 2010 || Mount Lemmon || Mount Lemmon Survey ||  || align=right | 2.4 km || 
|-id=247 bgcolor=#d6d6d6
| 519247 ||  || — || November 8, 2010 || Kitt Peak || Spacewatch || critical || align=right | 2.3 km || 
|-id=248 bgcolor=#E9E9E9
| 519248 ||  || — || April 8, 2008 || Kitt Peak || Spacewatch ||  || align=right data-sort-value="0.97" | 970 m || 
|-id=249 bgcolor=#E9E9E9
| 519249 ||  || — || November 17, 2001 || Kitt Peak || Spacewatch ||  || align=right | 1.1 km || 
|-id=250 bgcolor=#fefefe
| 519250 ||  || — || December 8, 2010 || Kitt Peak || Spacewatch ||  || align=right data-sort-value="0.59" | 590 m || 
|-id=251 bgcolor=#d6d6d6
| 519251 ||  || — || December 8, 2010 || Kitt Peak || Spacewatch ||  || align=right | 2.1 km || 
|-id=252 bgcolor=#d6d6d6
| 519252 ||  || — || December 10, 2010 || Mount Lemmon || Mount Lemmon Survey ||  || align=right | 2.5 km || 
|-id=253 bgcolor=#fefefe
| 519253 ||  || — || December 13, 2010 || Mount Lemmon || Mount Lemmon Survey ||  || align=right data-sort-value="0.76" | 760 m || 
|-id=254 bgcolor=#d6d6d6
| 519254 ||  || — || December 14, 2010 || Mount Lemmon || Mount Lemmon Survey ||  || align=right | 1.8 km || 
|-id=255 bgcolor=#d6d6d6
| 519255 ||  || — || September 9, 2008 || Mount Lemmon || Mount Lemmon Survey ||  || align=right | 2.8 km || 
|-id=256 bgcolor=#d6d6d6
| 519256 ||  || — || October 9, 2008 || Mount Lemmon || Mount Lemmon Survey ||  || align=right | 3.3 km || 
|-id=257 bgcolor=#d6d6d6
| 519257 ||  || — || December 6, 2010 || Mount Lemmon || Mount Lemmon Survey ||  || align=right | 2.5 km || 
|-id=258 bgcolor=#d6d6d6
| 519258 ||  || — || January 11, 2011 || Kitt Peak || Spacewatch ||  || align=right | 2.3 km || 
|-id=259 bgcolor=#d6d6d6
| 519259 ||  || — || January 12, 2011 || Mount Lemmon || Mount Lemmon Survey ||  || align=right | 3.3 km || 
|-id=260 bgcolor=#d6d6d6
| 519260 ||  || — || January 13, 2011 || Mount Lemmon || Mount Lemmon Survey ||  || align=right | 2.9 km || 
|-id=261 bgcolor=#d6d6d6
| 519261 ||  || — || January 14, 2011 || Mount Lemmon || Mount Lemmon Survey ||  || align=right | 2.6 km || 
|-id=262 bgcolor=#fefefe
| 519262 ||  || — || January 3, 2011 || Mount Lemmon || Mount Lemmon Survey ||  || align=right data-sort-value="0.73" | 730 m || 
|-id=263 bgcolor=#fefefe
| 519263 ||  || — || January 4, 2011 || Mount Lemmon || Mount Lemmon Survey ||  || align=right data-sort-value="0.76" | 760 m || 
|-id=264 bgcolor=#E9E9E9
| 519264 ||  || — || December 7, 2005 || Kitt Peak || Spacewatch ||  || align=right | 1.5 km || 
|-id=265 bgcolor=#d6d6d6
| 519265 ||  || — || February 24, 2006 || Kitt Peak || Spacewatch ||  || align=right | 2.6 km || 
|-id=266 bgcolor=#E9E9E9
| 519266 ||  || — || March 21, 2002 || Kitt Peak || Spacewatch ||  || align=right | 1.8 km || 
|-id=267 bgcolor=#fefefe
| 519267 ||  || — || January 10, 2011 || Mount Lemmon || Mount Lemmon Survey ||  || align=right data-sort-value="0.83" | 830 m || 
|-id=268 bgcolor=#E9E9E9
| 519268 ||  || — || January 11, 2011 || Kitt Peak || Spacewatch ||  || align=right | 1.1 km || 
|-id=269 bgcolor=#fefefe
| 519269 ||  || — || January 13, 2011 || Kitt Peak || Spacewatch ||  || align=right data-sort-value="0.54" | 540 m || 
|-id=270 bgcolor=#E9E9E9
| 519270 ||  || — || January 13, 2011 || Kitt Peak || Spacewatch ||  || align=right data-sort-value="0.79" | 790 m || 
|-id=271 bgcolor=#fefefe
| 519271 ||  || — || December 13, 2006 || Kitt Peak || Spacewatch ||  || align=right data-sort-value="0.55" | 550 m || 
|-id=272 bgcolor=#fefefe
| 519272 ||  || — || January 14, 2011 || Kitt Peak || Spacewatch ||  || align=right data-sort-value="0.55" | 550 m || 
|-id=273 bgcolor=#E9E9E9
| 519273 ||  || — || January 28, 2011 || Mount Lemmon || Mount Lemmon Survey ||  || align=right | 1.8 km || 
|-id=274 bgcolor=#d6d6d6
| 519274 ||  || — || April 14, 2007 || Kitt Peak || Spacewatch ||  || align=right | 3.0 km || 
|-id=275 bgcolor=#E9E9E9
| 519275 ||  || — || November 10, 2009 || Mount Lemmon || Mount Lemmon Survey ||  || align=right | 1.1 km || 
|-id=276 bgcolor=#E9E9E9
| 519276 ||  || — || January 24, 2011 || Mount Lemmon || Mount Lemmon Survey ||  || align=right data-sort-value="0.73" | 730 m || 
|-id=277 bgcolor=#d6d6d6
| 519277 ||  || — || January 23, 2006 || Kitt Peak || Spacewatch ||  || align=right | 2.4 km || 
|-id=278 bgcolor=#E9E9E9
| 519278 ||  || — || November 12, 2005 || Kitt Peak || Spacewatch ||  || align=right | 1.6 km || 
|-id=279 bgcolor=#fefefe
| 519279 ||  || — || January 26, 2011 || Mount Lemmon || Mount Lemmon Survey ||  || align=right data-sort-value="0.61" | 610 m || 
|-id=280 bgcolor=#fefefe
| 519280 ||  || — || January 27, 2011 || Mount Lemmon || Mount Lemmon Survey ||  || align=right data-sort-value="0.75" | 750 m || 
|-id=281 bgcolor=#E9E9E9
| 519281 ||  || — || January 27, 2011 || Mount Lemmon || Mount Lemmon Survey ||  || align=right | 1.5 km || 
|-id=282 bgcolor=#E9E9E9
| 519282 ||  || — || January 29, 2011 || Kitt Peak || Spacewatch ||  || align=right | 1.7 km || 
|-id=283 bgcolor=#E9E9E9
| 519283 ||  || — || June 7, 2003 || Kitt Peak || Spacewatch ||  || align=right | 1.5 km || 
|-id=284 bgcolor=#E9E9E9
| 519284 ||  || — || January 30, 2011 || Haleakala || Pan-STARRS ||  || align=right data-sort-value="0.87" | 870 m || 
|-id=285 bgcolor=#E9E9E9
| 519285 ||  || — || January 28, 2011 || Mount Lemmon || Mount Lemmon Survey ||  || align=right | 1.3 km || 
|-id=286 bgcolor=#E9E9E9
| 519286 ||  || — || October 27, 2009 || Kitt Peak || Spacewatch ||  || align=right | 1.3 km || 
|-id=287 bgcolor=#fefefe
| 519287 ||  || — || January 30, 2011 || Haleakala || Pan-STARRS ||  || align=right data-sort-value="0.87" | 870 m || 
|-id=288 bgcolor=#E9E9E9
| 519288 ||  || — || March 15, 2007 || Kitt Peak || Spacewatch ||  || align=right | 1.3 km || 
|-id=289 bgcolor=#E9E9E9
| 519289 ||  || — || January 30, 2011 || Haleakala || Pan-STARRS ||  || align=right | 1.0 km || 
|-id=290 bgcolor=#E9E9E9
| 519290 ||  || — || December 10, 2005 || Kitt Peak || Spacewatch ||  || align=right | 2.0 km || 
|-id=291 bgcolor=#E9E9E9
| 519291 ||  || — || January 30, 2011 || Haleakala || Pan-STARRS ||  || align=right | 1.0 km || 
|-id=292 bgcolor=#E9E9E9
| 519292 ||  || — || January 30, 2011 || Haleakala || Pan-STARRS ||  || align=right data-sort-value="0.91" | 910 m || 
|-id=293 bgcolor=#fefefe
| 519293 ||  || — || September 21, 2009 || Kitt Peak || Spacewatch ||  || align=right data-sort-value="0.75" | 750 m || 
|-id=294 bgcolor=#E9E9E9
| 519294 ||  || — || August 5, 2008 || La Sagra || OAM Obs. ||  || align=right | 1.9 km || 
|-id=295 bgcolor=#fefefe
| 519295 ||  || — || February 4, 2011 || Haleakala || Pan-STARRS ||  || align=right data-sort-value="0.93" | 930 m || 
|-id=296 bgcolor=#E9E9E9
| 519296 ||  || — || February 5, 2011 || Haleakala || Pan-STARRS ||  || align=right | 2.0 km || 
|-id=297 bgcolor=#d6d6d6
| 519297 ||  || — || February 5, 2011 || Haleakala || Pan-STARRS ||  || align=right | 2.3 km || 
|-id=298 bgcolor=#d6d6d6
| 519298 ||  || — || September 5, 2007 || Mount Lemmon || Mount Lemmon Survey ||  || align=right | 2.9 km || 
|-id=299 bgcolor=#fefefe
| 519299 ||  || — || September 17, 2009 || Kitt Peak || Spacewatch ||  || align=right data-sort-value="0.88" | 880 m || 
|-id=300 bgcolor=#E9E9E9
| 519300 ||  || — || February 13, 2011 || Mount Lemmon || Mount Lemmon Survey ||  || align=right | 1.8 km || 
|}

519301–519400 

|-bgcolor=#fefefe
| 519301 ||  || — || November 20, 2006 || Kitt Peak || Spacewatch ||  || align=right data-sort-value="0.75" | 750 m || 
|-id=302 bgcolor=#fefefe
| 519302 ||  || — || February 23, 2011 || Kitt Peak || Spacewatch ||  || align=right data-sort-value="0.61" | 610 m || 
|-id=303 bgcolor=#fefefe
| 519303 ||  || — || February 26, 2011 || Mount Lemmon || Mount Lemmon Survey ||  || align=right | 1.0 km || 
|-id=304 bgcolor=#fefefe
| 519304 ||  || — || February 25, 2011 || Kitt Peak || Spacewatch ||  || align=right data-sort-value="0.65" | 650 m || 
|-id=305 bgcolor=#E9E9E9
| 519305 ||  || — || February 25, 2011 || Kitt Peak || Spacewatch ||  || align=right | 2.1 km || 
|-id=306 bgcolor=#E9E9E9
| 519306 ||  || — || March 26, 2007 || Mount Lemmon || Mount Lemmon Survey ||  || align=right data-sort-value="0.81" | 810 m || 
|-id=307 bgcolor=#FFC2E0
| 519307 ||  || — || February 25, 2011 || Mount Lemmon || Mount Lemmon Survey || AMOcritical || align=right data-sort-value="0.34" | 340 m || 
|-id=308 bgcolor=#E9E9E9
| 519308 ||  || — || December 28, 2005 || Kitt Peak || Spacewatch ||  || align=right | 1.5 km || 
|-id=309 bgcolor=#fefefe
| 519309 ||  || — || March 11, 2011 || Kitt Peak || Spacewatch ||  || align=right data-sort-value="0.67" | 670 m || 
|-id=310 bgcolor=#d6d6d6
| 519310 ||  || — || March 2, 2011 || Kitt Peak || Spacewatch ||  || align=right | 2.0 km || 
|-id=311 bgcolor=#E9E9E9
| 519311 ||  || — || March 2, 2011 || Kitt Peak || Spacewatch ||  || align=right | 1.7 km || 
|-id=312 bgcolor=#d6d6d6
| 519312 ||  || — || October 8, 2008 || Kitt Peak || Spacewatch ||  || align=right | 2.5 km || 
|-id=313 bgcolor=#E9E9E9
| 519313 ||  || — || March 2, 2011 || Mount Lemmon || Mount Lemmon Survey ||  || align=right | 1.9 km || 
|-id=314 bgcolor=#E9E9E9
| 519314 ||  || — || February 23, 2011 || Kitt Peak || Spacewatch ||  || align=right | 1.2 km || 
|-id=315 bgcolor=#E9E9E9
| 519315 ||  || — || August 7, 2008 || Kitt Peak || Spacewatch ||  || align=right | 1.1 km || 
|-id=316 bgcolor=#d6d6d6
| 519316 ||  || — || March 6, 2011 || Mount Lemmon || Mount Lemmon Survey ||  || align=right | 3.1 km || 
|-id=317 bgcolor=#E9E9E9
| 519317 ||  || — || March 6, 2011 || Mount Lemmon || Mount Lemmon Survey ||  || align=right | 1.5 km || 
|-id=318 bgcolor=#E9E9E9
| 519318 ||  || — || March 13, 2007 || Kitt Peak || Spacewatch ||  || align=right data-sort-value="0.71" | 710 m || 
|-id=319 bgcolor=#fefefe
| 519319 ||  || — || October 9, 2005 || Kitt Peak || Spacewatch ||  || align=right data-sort-value="0.78" | 780 m || 
|-id=320 bgcolor=#E9E9E9
| 519320 ||  || — || March 11, 2011 || Kitt Peak || Spacewatch ||  || align=right data-sort-value="0.83" | 830 m || 
|-id=321 bgcolor=#fefefe
| 519321 ||  || — || September 17, 2009 || Kitt Peak || Spacewatch ||  || align=right data-sort-value="0.83" | 830 m || 
|-id=322 bgcolor=#fefefe
| 519322 ||  || — || November 18, 2009 || Kitt Peak || Spacewatch ||  || align=right data-sort-value="0.78" | 780 m || 
|-id=323 bgcolor=#E9E9E9
| 519323 ||  || — || September 21, 2008 || Mount Lemmon || Mount Lemmon Survey ||  || align=right | 2.2 km || 
|-id=324 bgcolor=#d6d6d6
| 519324 ||  || — || November 24, 2008 || Kitt Peak || Spacewatch ||  || align=right | 2.9 km || 
|-id=325 bgcolor=#E9E9E9
| 519325 ||  || — || March 29, 2011 || Mount Lemmon || Mount Lemmon Survey ||  || align=right | 1.1 km || 
|-id=326 bgcolor=#fefefe
| 519326 ||  || — || September 12, 2005 || Kitt Peak || Spacewatch ||  || align=right data-sort-value="0.89" | 890 m || 
|-id=327 bgcolor=#E9E9E9
| 519327 ||  || — || March 30, 2011 || Mount Lemmon || Mount Lemmon Survey ||  || align=right | 1.3 km || 
|-id=328 bgcolor=#fefefe
| 519328 ||  || — || March 10, 2011 || Kitt Peak || Spacewatch ||  || align=right data-sort-value="0.82" | 820 m || 
|-id=329 bgcolor=#d6d6d6
| 519329 ||  || — || September 12, 2007 || Mount Lemmon || Mount Lemmon Survey ||  || align=right | 2.3 km || 
|-id=330 bgcolor=#E9E9E9
| 519330 ||  || — || March 31, 2011 || Haleakala || Pan-STARRS ||  || align=right | 1.3 km || 
|-id=331 bgcolor=#d6d6d6
| 519331 ||  || — || October 8, 2008 || Kitt Peak || Spacewatch ||  || align=right | 2.8 km || 
|-id=332 bgcolor=#E9E9E9
| 519332 ||  || — || March 25, 2011 || Kitt Peak || Spacewatch ||  || align=right | 2.1 km || 
|-id=333 bgcolor=#E9E9E9
| 519333 ||  || — || March 10, 2002 || Kitt Peak || Spacewatch ||  || align=right | 1.1 km || 
|-id=334 bgcolor=#E9E9E9
| 519334 ||  || — || September 24, 2008 || Kitt Peak || Spacewatch ||  || align=right | 2.1 km || 
|-id=335 bgcolor=#E9E9E9
| 519335 ||  || — || October 8, 2004 || Kitt Peak || Spacewatch ||  || align=right | 1.8 km || 
|-id=336 bgcolor=#E9E9E9
| 519336 ||  || — || March 30, 2011 || Mount Lemmon || Mount Lemmon Survey ||  || align=right data-sort-value="0.91" | 910 m || 
|-id=337 bgcolor=#E9E9E9
| 519337 ||  || — || March 30, 2011 || Mount Lemmon || Mount Lemmon Survey ||  || align=right | 1.8 km || 
|-id=338 bgcolor=#E9E9E9
| 519338 ||  || — || March 14, 2011 || Catalina || CSS ||  || align=right | 1.7 km || 
|-id=339 bgcolor=#fefefe
| 519339 ||  || — || March 28, 2011 || Kitt Peak || Spacewatch || PHO || align=right data-sort-value="0.65" | 650 m || 
|-id=340 bgcolor=#E9E9E9
| 519340 ||  || — || April 1, 2011 || Kitt Peak || Spacewatch ||  || align=right | 2.1 km || 
|-id=341 bgcolor=#E9E9E9
| 519341 ||  || — || April 1, 2011 || Mount Lemmon || Mount Lemmon Survey ||  || align=right | 1.5 km || 
|-id=342 bgcolor=#E9E9E9
| 519342 ||  || — || April 2, 2011 || Kitt Peak || Spacewatch ||  || align=right data-sort-value="0.94" | 940 m || 
|-id=343 bgcolor=#d6d6d6
| 519343 ||  || — || April 6, 2011 || Mount Lemmon || Mount Lemmon Survey ||  || align=right | 3.4 km || 
|-id=344 bgcolor=#E9E9E9
| 519344 ||  || — || April 13, 2011 || Kitt Peak || Spacewatch ||  || align=right | 2.4 km || 
|-id=345 bgcolor=#d6d6d6
| 519345 ||  || — || June 23, 2000 || Kitt Peak || Spacewatch ||  || align=right | 2.5 km || 
|-id=346 bgcolor=#fefefe
| 519346 ||  || — || April 23, 2011 || Kitt Peak || Spacewatch ||  || align=right data-sort-value="0.86" | 860 m || 
|-id=347 bgcolor=#fefefe
| 519347 ||  || — || April 6, 2011 || Mount Lemmon || Mount Lemmon Survey || BAP || align=right data-sort-value="0.87" | 870 m || 
|-id=348 bgcolor=#fefefe
| 519348 ||  || — || March 31, 2004 || Kitt Peak || Spacewatch ||  || align=right data-sort-value="0.51" | 510 m || 
|-id=349 bgcolor=#fefefe
| 519349 ||  || — || March 15, 2004 || Kitt Peak || Spacewatch ||  || align=right data-sort-value="0.57" | 570 m || 
|-id=350 bgcolor=#E9E9E9
| 519350 ||  || — || April 23, 2011 || Haleakala || Pan-STARRS ||  || align=right | 2.0 km || 
|-id=351 bgcolor=#fefefe
| 519351 ||  || — || May 1, 2011 || Mount Lemmon || Mount Lemmon Survey ||  || align=right data-sort-value="0.80" | 800 m || 
|-id=352 bgcolor=#fefefe
| 519352 ||  || — || May 7, 2011 || Mount Lemmon || Mount Lemmon Survey ||  || align=right data-sort-value="0.97" | 970 m || 
|-id=353 bgcolor=#d6d6d6
| 519353 ||  || — || May 24, 2011 || Mount Lemmon || Mount Lemmon Survey ||  || align=right | 3.0 km || 
|-id=354 bgcolor=#FFC2E0
| 519354 ||  || — || May 25, 2011 || Siding Spring || SSS || APO || align=right data-sort-value="0.18" | 180 m || 
|-id=355 bgcolor=#E9E9E9
| 519355 ||  || — || May 3, 2011 || Mount Lemmon || Mount Lemmon Survey ||  || align=right | 1.0 km || 
|-id=356 bgcolor=#d6d6d6
| 519356 ||  || — || August 10, 2007 || Kitt Peak || Spacewatch ||  || align=right | 2.6 km || 
|-id=357 bgcolor=#d6d6d6
| 519357 ||  || — || October 21, 2008 || Kitt Peak || Spacewatch ||  || align=right | 2.2 km || 
|-id=358 bgcolor=#d6d6d6
| 519358 ||  || — || May 23, 2011 || Mount Lemmon || Mount Lemmon Survey ||  || align=right | 3.2 km || 
|-id=359 bgcolor=#d6d6d6
| 519359 ||  || — || May 24, 2011 || Mount Lemmon || Mount Lemmon Survey ||  || align=right | 2.6 km || 
|-id=360 bgcolor=#E9E9E9
| 519360 ||  || — || May 27, 2011 || Kitt Peak || Spacewatch ||  || align=right | 1.8 km || 
|-id=361 bgcolor=#d6d6d6
| 519361 ||  || — || May 29, 2011 || Kitt Peak || Spacewatch ||  || align=right | 2.6 km || 
|-id=362 bgcolor=#E9E9E9
| 519362 ||  || — || June 2, 2011 || Haleakala || Pan-STARRS ||  || align=right | 1.5 km || 
|-id=363 bgcolor=#d6d6d6
| 519363 ||  || — || June 8, 2011 || Haleakala || Pan-STARRS ||  || align=right | 3.6 km || 
|-id=364 bgcolor=#E9E9E9
| 519364 ||  || — || June 27, 2011 || Mount Lemmon || Mount Lemmon Survey ||  || align=right | 1.7 km || 
|-id=365 bgcolor=#d6d6d6
| 519365 ||  || — || July 2, 2011 || Kitt Peak || Spacewatch ||  || align=right | 2.9 km || 
|-id=366 bgcolor=#d6d6d6
| 519366 ||  || — || July 9, 2011 || Haleakala || Pan-STARRS ||  || align=right | 3.7 km || 
|-id=367 bgcolor=#E9E9E9
| 519367 ||  || — || June 9, 2011 || Mount Lemmon || Mount Lemmon Survey ||  || align=right | 1.0 km || 
|-id=368 bgcolor=#E9E9E9
| 519368 ||  || — || September 10, 2007 || Catalina || CSS ||  || align=right | 1.7 km || 
|-id=369 bgcolor=#d6d6d6
| 519369 ||  || — || April 15, 2010 || Kitt Peak || Spacewatch ||  || align=right | 2.6 km || 
|-id=370 bgcolor=#E9E9E9
| 519370 ||  || — || May 24, 2006 || Kitt Peak || Spacewatch ||  || align=right | 1.4 km || 
|-id=371 bgcolor=#d6d6d6
| 519371 ||  || — || July 27, 2011 || Haleakala || Pan-STARRS ||  || align=right | 2.6 km || 
|-id=372 bgcolor=#d6d6d6
| 519372 ||  || — || July 28, 2011 || Haleakala || Pan-STARRS ||  || align=right | 2.0 km || 
|-id=373 bgcolor=#d6d6d6
| 519373 ||  || — || January 15, 2008 || Kitt Peak || Spacewatch ||  || align=right | 2.9 km || 
|-id=374 bgcolor=#d6d6d6
| 519374 ||  || — || August 10, 2011 || Haleakala || Pan-STARRS ||  || align=right | 2.6 km || 
|-id=375 bgcolor=#E9E9E9
| 519375 ||  || — || October 10, 2007 || Kitt Peak || Spacewatch ||  || align=right | 2.0 km || 
|-id=376 bgcolor=#fefefe
| 519376 ||  || — || August 20, 2011 || Haleakala || Pan-STARRS ||  || align=right data-sort-value="0.86" | 860 m || 
|-id=377 bgcolor=#fefefe
| 519377 ||  || — || July 27, 2011 || Haleakala || Pan-STARRS || NYS || align=right data-sort-value="0.66" | 660 m || 
|-id=378 bgcolor=#fefefe
| 519378 ||  || — || August 23, 2011 || Haleakala || Pan-STARRS ||  || align=right data-sort-value="0.82" | 820 m || 
|-id=379 bgcolor=#fefefe
| 519379 ||  || — || December 3, 2004 || Kitt Peak || Spacewatch ||  || align=right | 1.1 km || 
|-id=380 bgcolor=#fefefe
| 519380 ||  || — || March 20, 2010 || Kitt Peak || Spacewatch ||  || align=right data-sort-value="0.65" | 650 m || 
|-id=381 bgcolor=#E9E9E9
| 519381 ||  || — || August 27, 2011 || Haleakala || Pan-STARRS ||  || align=right | 2.1 km || 
|-id=382 bgcolor=#E9E9E9
| 519382 ||  || — || August 28, 2011 || Siding Spring || SSS ||  || align=right | 2.4 km || 
|-id=383 bgcolor=#d6d6d6
| 519383 ||  || — || May 7, 2010 || Mount Lemmon || Mount Lemmon Survey ||  || align=right | 2.9 km || 
|-id=384 bgcolor=#E9E9E9
| 519384 ||  || — || September 18, 2007 || Kitt Peak || Spacewatch ||  || align=right | 1.0 km || 
|-id=385 bgcolor=#d6d6d6
| 519385 ||  || — || September 2, 2011 || Haleakala || Pan-STARRS ||  || align=right | 2.5 km || 
|-id=386 bgcolor=#d6d6d6
| 519386 ||  || — || January 29, 2009 || Mount Lemmon || Mount Lemmon Survey ||  || align=right | 2.7 km || 
|-id=387 bgcolor=#d6d6d6
| 519387 ||  || — || September 4, 2011 || Haleakala || Pan-STARRS ||  || align=right | 2.4 km || 
|-id=388 bgcolor=#FA8072
| 519388 ||  || — || August 23, 2011 || Haleakala || Pan-STARRS || H || align=right data-sort-value="0.52" | 520 m || 
|-id=389 bgcolor=#fefefe
| 519389 ||  || — || September 18, 2011 || Haleakala || Pan-STARRS || H || align=right data-sort-value="0.67" | 670 m || 
|-id=390 bgcolor=#d6d6d6
| 519390 ||  || — || June 17, 2005 || Mount Lemmon || Mount Lemmon Survey ||  || align=right | 1.9 km || 
|-id=391 bgcolor=#d6d6d6
| 519391 ||  || — || September 19, 2011 || Mount Lemmon || Mount Lemmon Survey ||  || align=right | 2.1 km || 
|-id=392 bgcolor=#E9E9E9
| 519392 ||  || — || March 23, 2009 || Kitt Peak || Spacewatch ||  || align=right | 2.0 km || 
|-id=393 bgcolor=#fefefe
| 519393 ||  || — || June 9, 2011 || Haleakala || Pan-STARRS ||  || align=right | 1.1 km || 
|-id=394 bgcolor=#fefefe
| 519394 ||  || — || September 20, 2011 || Mount Lemmon || Mount Lemmon Survey ||  || align=right data-sort-value="0.68" | 680 m || 
|-id=395 bgcolor=#fefefe
| 519395 ||  || — || June 9, 2011 || Haleakala || Pan-STARRS ||  || align=right data-sort-value="0.89" | 890 m || 
|-id=396 bgcolor=#d6d6d6
| 519396 ||  || — || September 19, 2011 || Catalina || CSS ||  || align=right | 2.8 km || 
|-id=397 bgcolor=#E9E9E9
| 519397 ||  || — || November 2, 2007 || Mount Lemmon || Mount Lemmon Survey ||  || align=right | 1.1 km || 
|-id=398 bgcolor=#d6d6d6
| 519398 ||  || — || November 10, 2006 || Kitt Peak || Spacewatch ||  || align=right | 2.7 km || 
|-id=399 bgcolor=#E9E9E9
| 519399 ||  || — || February 2, 2009 || Kitt Peak || Spacewatch ||  || align=right | 1.5 km || 
|-id=400 bgcolor=#d6d6d6
| 519400 ||  || — || September 21, 2011 || Kitt Peak || Spacewatch ||  || align=right | 3.6 km || 
|}

519401–519500 

|-bgcolor=#E9E9E9
| 519401 ||  || — || September 23, 2011 || Haleakala || Pan-STARRS ||  || align=right | 1.6 km || 
|-id=402 bgcolor=#E9E9E9
| 519402 ||  || — || March 17, 2009 || Kitt Peak || Spacewatch ||  || align=right | 1.6 km || 
|-id=403 bgcolor=#d6d6d6
| 519403 ||  || — || September 24, 2011 || Haleakala || Pan-STARRS ||  || align=right | 2.4 km || 
|-id=404 bgcolor=#E9E9E9
| 519404 ||  || — || September 24, 2011 || Haleakala || Pan-STARRS ||  || align=right | 1.5 km || 
|-id=405 bgcolor=#d6d6d6
| 519405 ||  || — || September 24, 2011 || Haleakala || Pan-STARRS ||  || align=right | 2.4 km || 
|-id=406 bgcolor=#d6d6d6
| 519406 ||  || — || September 24, 2011 || Haleakala || Pan-STARRS ||  || align=right | 1.9 km || 
|-id=407 bgcolor=#E9E9E9
| 519407 ||  || — || September 25, 2011 || Haleakala || Pan-STARRS ||  || align=right | 2.3 km || 
|-id=408 bgcolor=#E9E9E9
| 519408 ||  || — || September 25, 2011 || Haleakala || Pan-STARRS ||  || align=right | 2.2 km || 
|-id=409 bgcolor=#d6d6d6
| 519409 ||  || — || September 27, 2011 || Mount Lemmon || Mount Lemmon Survey ||  || align=right | 3.0 km || 
|-id=410 bgcolor=#d6d6d6
| 519410 ||  || — || September 29, 2005 || Kitt Peak || Spacewatch ||  || align=right | 2.9 km || 
|-id=411 bgcolor=#E9E9E9
| 519411 ||  || — || September 24, 2011 || Haleakala || Pan-STARRS ||  || align=right data-sort-value="0.86" | 860 m || 
|-id=412 bgcolor=#fefefe
| 519412 ||  || — || October 18, 2011 || Kitt Peak || Spacewatch || H || align=right data-sort-value="0.56" | 560 m || 
|-id=413 bgcolor=#E9E9E9
| 519413 ||  || — || October 21, 2011 || Mount Lemmon || Mount Lemmon Survey ||  || align=right | 2.2 km || 
|-id=414 bgcolor=#fefefe
| 519414 ||  || — || June 4, 2005 || Kitt Peak || Spacewatch || H || align=right data-sort-value="0.47" | 470 m || 
|-id=415 bgcolor=#E9E9E9
| 519415 ||  || — || October 19, 2011 || Mount Lemmon || Mount Lemmon Survey ||  || align=right | 1.7 km || 
|-id=416 bgcolor=#E9E9E9
| 519416 ||  || — || October 19, 2011 || Mount Lemmon || Mount Lemmon Survey || MAR || align=right | 1.3 km || 
|-id=417 bgcolor=#E9E9E9
| 519417 ||  || — || October 21, 2011 || Mount Lemmon || Mount Lemmon Survey ||  || align=right | 1.7 km || 
|-id=418 bgcolor=#fefefe
| 519418 ||  || — || October 23, 2011 || Socorro || LINEAR || H || align=right data-sort-value="0.86" | 860 m || 
|-id=419 bgcolor=#E9E9E9
| 519419 ||  || — || October 25, 2011 || XuYi || PMO NEO ||  || align=right | 1.6 km || 
|-id=420 bgcolor=#d6d6d6
| 519420 ||  || — || October 17, 2011 || Kitt Peak || Spacewatch ||  || align=right | 2.5 km || 
|-id=421 bgcolor=#d6d6d6
| 519421 ||  || — || September 23, 2011 || Kitt Peak || Spacewatch ||  || align=right | 2.6 km || 
|-id=422 bgcolor=#fefefe
| 519422 ||  || — || October 24, 2011 || Kitt Peak || Spacewatch || H || align=right data-sort-value="0.59" | 590 m || 
|-id=423 bgcolor=#d6d6d6
| 519423 ||  || — || January 14, 2002 || Kitt Peak || Spacewatch ||  || align=right | 2.3 km || 
|-id=424 bgcolor=#E9E9E9
| 519424 ||  || — || October 18, 2011 || Haleakala || Pan-STARRS ||  || align=right | 1.7 km || 
|-id=425 bgcolor=#E9E9E9
| 519425 ||  || — || April 15, 2005 || Catalina || CSS ||  || align=right | 2.9 km || 
|-id=426 bgcolor=#E9E9E9
| 519426 ||  || — || October 18, 2011 || Mount Lemmon || Mount Lemmon Survey ||  || align=right data-sort-value="0.71" | 710 m || 
|-id=427 bgcolor=#d6d6d6
| 519427 ||  || — || October 19, 2011 || Kitt Peak || Spacewatch ||  || align=right | 2.4 km || 
|-id=428 bgcolor=#d6d6d6
| 519428 ||  || — || October 20, 2006 || Kitt Peak || Spacewatch ||  || align=right | 2.1 km || 
|-id=429 bgcolor=#E9E9E9
| 519429 ||  || — || December 3, 2007 || Kitt Peak || Spacewatch ||  || align=right | 1.9 km || 
|-id=430 bgcolor=#d6d6d6
| 519430 ||  || — || October 22, 2011 || Kitt Peak || Spacewatch ||  || align=right | 2.7 km || 
|-id=431 bgcolor=#d6d6d6
| 519431 ||  || — || October 23, 2011 || Kitt Peak || Spacewatch ||  || align=right | 2.4 km || 
|-id=432 bgcolor=#E9E9E9
| 519432 ||  || — || October 24, 2011 || Haleakala || Pan-STARRS ||  || align=right data-sort-value="0.89" | 890 m || 
|-id=433 bgcolor=#E9E9E9
| 519433 ||  || — || October 24, 2011 || Haleakala || Pan-STARRS ||  || align=right | 1.3 km || 
|-id=434 bgcolor=#d6d6d6
| 519434 ||  || — || September 6, 2010 || Mount Lemmon || Mount Lemmon Survey ||  || align=right | 3.3 km || 
|-id=435 bgcolor=#d6d6d6
| 519435 ||  || — || October 26, 2011 || Haleakala || Pan-STARRS ||  || align=right | 1.8 km || 
|-id=436 bgcolor=#d6d6d6
| 519436 ||  || — || October 27, 2011 || Mount Lemmon || Mount Lemmon Survey ||  || align=right | 2.9 km || 
|-id=437 bgcolor=#d6d6d6
| 519437 ||  || — || November 3, 2006 || Mount Lemmon || Mount Lemmon Survey ||  || align=right | 3.2 km || 
|-id=438 bgcolor=#d6d6d6
| 519438 ||  || — || November 1, 2011 || Kitt Peak || Spacewatch ||  || align=right | 2.8 km || 
|-id=439 bgcolor=#fefefe
| 519439 ||  || — || October 24, 2011 || Haleakala || Pan-STARRS || H || align=right data-sort-value="0.71" | 710 m || 
|-id=440 bgcolor=#E9E9E9
| 519440 ||  || — || October 23, 2011 || Haleakala || Pan-STARRS || EUN || align=right | 1.1 km || 
|-id=441 bgcolor=#E9E9E9
| 519441 ||  || — || November 16, 2011 || Mount Lemmon || Mount Lemmon Survey ||  || align=right | 2.3 km || 
|-id=442 bgcolor=#E9E9E9
| 519442 ||  || — || November 24, 2011 || Haleakala || Pan-STARRS ||  || align=right | 1.3 km || 
|-id=443 bgcolor=#d6d6d6
| 519443 ||  || — || September 25, 2005 || Catalina || CSS ||  || align=right | 3.9 km || 
|-id=444 bgcolor=#E9E9E9
| 519444 ||  || — || December 31, 2007 || Mount Lemmon || Mount Lemmon Survey ||  || align=right | 2.2 km || 
|-id=445 bgcolor=#d6d6d6
| 519445 ||  || — || November 24, 2011 || Mount Lemmon || Mount Lemmon Survey ||  || align=right | 3.0 km || 
|-id=446 bgcolor=#fefefe
| 519446 ||  || — || November 30, 2011 || Mount Lemmon || Mount Lemmon Survey || H || align=right data-sort-value="0.43" | 430 m || 
|-id=447 bgcolor=#d6d6d6
| 519447 ||  || — || December 29, 2011 || Kitt Peak || Spacewatch ||  || align=right | 2.2 km || 
|-id=448 bgcolor=#E9E9E9
| 519448 ||  || — || December 31, 2011 || Kitt Peak || Spacewatch ||  || align=right | 2.3 km || 
|-id=449 bgcolor=#E9E9E9
| 519449 ||  || — || December 24, 2011 || Mount Lemmon || Mount Lemmon Survey ||  || align=right | 1.6 km || 
|-id=450 bgcolor=#d6d6d6
| 519450 ||  || — || January 5, 2006 || Catalina || CSS ||  || align=right | 2.7 km || 
|-id=451 bgcolor=#d6d6d6
| 519451 ||  || — || December 28, 2011 || Kitt Peak || Spacewatch || 7:4 || align=right | 2.7 km || 
|-id=452 bgcolor=#fefefe
| 519452 ||  || — || November 5, 2007 || Kitt Peak || Spacewatch ||  || align=right data-sort-value="0.82" | 820 m || 
|-id=453 bgcolor=#d6d6d6
| 519453 ||  || — || December 6, 2005 || Kitt Peak || Spacewatch ||  || align=right | 2.7 km || 
|-id=454 bgcolor=#fefefe
| 519454 ||  || — || September 19, 2007 || Kitt Peak || Spacewatch ||  || align=right data-sort-value="0.65" | 650 m || 
|-id=455 bgcolor=#E9E9E9
| 519455 ||  || — || April 14, 2004 || Kitt Peak || Spacewatch ||  || align=right | 1.3 km || 
|-id=456 bgcolor=#E9E9E9
| 519456 ||  || — || July 27, 2009 || Kitt Peak || Spacewatch ||  || align=right | 1.8 km || 
|-id=457 bgcolor=#d6d6d6
| 519457 ||  || — || December 27, 2011 || Mount Lemmon || Mount Lemmon Survey ||  || align=right | 2.3 km || 
|-id=458 bgcolor=#fefefe
| 519458 ||  || — || January 5, 2012 || Kitt Peak || Spacewatch ||  || align=right data-sort-value="0.70" | 700 m || 
|-id=459 bgcolor=#d6d6d6
| 519459 ||  || — || November 11, 2010 || Kitt Peak || Spacewatch ||  || align=right | 2.1 km || 
|-id=460 bgcolor=#E9E9E9
| 519460 ||  || — || August 17, 2009 || Kitt Peak || Spacewatch ||  || align=right data-sort-value="0.94" | 940 m || 
|-id=461 bgcolor=#d6d6d6
| 519461 ||  || — || January 14, 2012 || Kitt Peak || Spacewatch ||  || align=right | 2.4 km || 
|-id=462 bgcolor=#E9E9E9
| 519462 ||  || — || November 11, 2006 || Kitt Peak || Spacewatch ||  || align=right | 2.2 km || 
|-id=463 bgcolor=#d6d6d6
| 519463 ||  || — || December 28, 2011 || Mount Lemmon || Mount Lemmon Survey ||  || align=right | 2.6 km || 
|-id=464 bgcolor=#d6d6d6
| 519464 ||  || — || August 18, 2009 || Kitt Peak || Spacewatch ||  || align=right | 2.8 km || 
|-id=465 bgcolor=#d6d6d6
| 519465 ||  || — || January 19, 2012 || Mount Lemmon || Mount Lemmon Survey ||  || align=right | 2.9 km || 
|-id=466 bgcolor=#d6d6d6
| 519466 ||  || — || January 19, 2012 || Haleakala || Pan-STARRS ||  || align=right | 2.3 km || 
|-id=467 bgcolor=#d6d6d6
| 519467 ||  || — || January 19, 2012 || Haleakala || Pan-STARRS ||  || align=right | 2.8 km || 
|-id=468 bgcolor=#E9E9E9
| 519468 ||  || — || December 24, 2006 || Mount Lemmon || Mount Lemmon Survey ||  || align=right | 2.2 km || 
|-id=469 bgcolor=#d6d6d6
| 519469 ||  || — || January 19, 2012 || Haleakala || Pan-STARRS ||  || align=right | 2.1 km || 
|-id=470 bgcolor=#fefefe
| 519470 ||  || — || January 19, 2012 || Haleakala || Pan-STARRS ||  || align=right data-sort-value="0.75" | 750 m || 
|-id=471 bgcolor=#fefefe
| 519471 ||  || — || January 19, 2012 || Haleakala || Pan-STARRS ||  || align=right data-sort-value="0.76" | 760 m || 
|-id=472 bgcolor=#d6d6d6
| 519472 ||  || — || January 20, 2012 || Haleakala || Pan-STARRS ||  || align=right | 2.8 km || 
|-id=473 bgcolor=#d6d6d6
| 519473 ||  || — || January 26, 2012 || Kitt Peak || Spacewatch ||  || align=right | 3.4 km || 
|-id=474 bgcolor=#E9E9E9
| 519474 ||  || — || January 29, 2012 || Kitt Peak || Spacewatch ||  || align=right | 1.4 km || 
|-id=475 bgcolor=#fefefe
| 519475 ||  || — || February 4, 2012 || Haleakala || Pan-STARRS || H || align=right data-sort-value="0.80" | 800 m || 
|-id=476 bgcolor=#d6d6d6
| 519476 ||  || — || February 11, 2012 || Mount Lemmon || Mount Lemmon Survey ||  || align=right | 2.2 km || 
|-id=477 bgcolor=#E9E9E9
| 519477 ||  || — || February 1, 2012 || Kitt Peak || Spacewatch ||  || align=right | 1.5 km || 
|-id=478 bgcolor=#d6d6d6
| 519478 ||  || — || February 25, 2007 || Kitt Peak || Spacewatch ||  || align=right | 1.9 km || 
|-id=479 bgcolor=#d6d6d6
| 519479 ||  || — || February 25, 2007 || Kitt Peak || Spacewatch ||  || align=right | 1.9 km || 
|-id=480 bgcolor=#d6d6d6
| 519480 ||  || — || December 25, 2005 || Kitt Peak || Spacewatch ||  || align=right | 2.6 km || 
|-id=481 bgcolor=#fefefe
| 519481 ||  || — || February 24, 2012 || Mount Lemmon || Mount Lemmon Survey ||  || align=right data-sort-value="0.56" | 560 m || 
|-id=482 bgcolor=#d6d6d6
| 519482 ||  || — || November 26, 2010 || Mount Lemmon || Mount Lemmon Survey ||  || align=right | 3.3 km || 
|-id=483 bgcolor=#E9E9E9
| 519483 ||  || — || September 14, 2005 || Kitt Peak || Spacewatch ||  || align=right | 1.7 km || 
|-id=484 bgcolor=#d6d6d6
| 519484 ||  || — || February 16, 2012 || Haleakala || Pan-STARRS ||  || align=right | 2.8 km || 
|-id=485 bgcolor=#E9E9E9
| 519485 ||  || — || July 16, 2005 || Siding Spring || SSS ||  || align=right | 1.7 km || 
|-id=486 bgcolor=#d6d6d6
| 519486 ||  || — || February 20, 2012 || Haleakala || Pan-STARRS ||  || align=right | 2.7 km || 
|-id=487 bgcolor=#d6d6d6
| 519487 ||  || — || February 23, 2012 || Kitt Peak || Spacewatch ||  || align=right | 2.3 km || 
|-id=488 bgcolor=#d6d6d6
| 519488 ||  || — || February 24, 2012 || Kitt Peak || Spacewatch ||  || align=right | 2.9 km || 
|-id=489 bgcolor=#fefefe
| 519489 ||  || — || November 3, 2010 || Mount Lemmon || Mount Lemmon Survey ||  || align=right data-sort-value="0.71" | 710 m || 
|-id=490 bgcolor=#E9E9E9
| 519490 ||  || — || October 7, 2005 || Mount Lemmon || Mount Lemmon Survey ||  || align=right | 1.6 km || 
|-id=491 bgcolor=#d6d6d6
| 519491 ||  || — || February 26, 2012 || Haleakala || Pan-STARRS ||  || align=right | 1.9 km || 
|-id=492 bgcolor=#fefefe
| 519492 ||  || — || September 18, 2006 || Kitt Peak || Spacewatch ||  || align=right data-sort-value="0.76" | 760 m || 
|-id=493 bgcolor=#E9E9E9
| 519493 ||  || — || October 20, 2006 || Mount Lemmon || Mount Lemmon Survey ||  || align=right data-sort-value="0.95" | 950 m || 
|-id=494 bgcolor=#d6d6d6
| 519494 ||  || — || September 27, 2009 || Kitt Peak || Spacewatch ||  || align=right | 2.1 km || 
|-id=495 bgcolor=#d6d6d6
| 519495 ||  || — || February 27, 2012 || Haleakala || Pan-STARRS ||  || align=right | 2.3 km || 
|-id=496 bgcolor=#E9E9E9
| 519496 ||  || — || February 27, 2012 || Haleakala || Pan-STARRS ||  || align=right data-sort-value="0.74" | 740 m || 
|-id=497 bgcolor=#fefefe
| 519497 ||  || — || February 7, 2008 || Mount Lemmon || Mount Lemmon Survey ||  || align=right data-sort-value="0.64" | 640 m || 
|-id=498 bgcolor=#d6d6d6
| 519498 ||  || — || September 18, 2003 || Kitt Peak || Spacewatch ||  || align=right | 3.1 km || 
|-id=499 bgcolor=#d6d6d6
| 519499 ||  || — || September 17, 2009 || Kitt Peak || Spacewatch ||  || align=right | 2.0 km || 
|-id=500 bgcolor=#d6d6d6
| 519500 ||  || — || February 28, 2012 || Haleakala || Pan-STARRS ||  || align=right | 1.9 km || 
|}

519501–519600 

|-bgcolor=#fefefe
| 519501 ||  || — || February 9, 2008 || Kitt Peak || Spacewatch ||  || align=right data-sort-value="0.60" | 600 m || 
|-id=502 bgcolor=#fefefe
| 519502 ||  || — || February 28, 2012 || Haleakala || Pan-STARRS ||  || align=right data-sort-value="0.89" | 890 m || 
|-id=503 bgcolor=#fefefe
| 519503 ||  || — || February 26, 2008 || Mount Lemmon || Mount Lemmon Survey ||  || align=right data-sort-value="0.68" | 680 m || 
|-id=504 bgcolor=#FFC2E0
| 519504 ||  || — || March 15, 2012 || Mount Lemmon || Mount Lemmon Survey || AMOcritical || align=right data-sort-value="0.31" | 310 m || 
|-id=505 bgcolor=#d6d6d6
| 519505 ||  || — || August 27, 2009 || Kitt Peak || Spacewatch ||  || align=right | 2.5 km || 
|-id=506 bgcolor=#E9E9E9
| 519506 ||  || — || March 1, 2012 || Mount Lemmon || Mount Lemmon Survey ||  || align=right | 2.1 km || 
|-id=507 bgcolor=#E9E9E9
| 519507 ||  || — || November 11, 2010 || Mount Lemmon || Mount Lemmon Survey ||  || align=right | 1.1 km || 
|-id=508 bgcolor=#d6d6d6
| 519508 ||  || — || March 15, 2012 || Haleakala || Pan-STARRS ||  || align=right | 2.7 km || 
|-id=509 bgcolor=#d6d6d6
| 519509 ||  || — || June 8, 2007 || Kitt Peak || Spacewatch ||  || align=right | 2.4 km || 
|-id=510 bgcolor=#d6d6d6
| 519510 ||  || — || March 27, 2012 || Mount Lemmon || Mount Lemmon Survey ||  || align=right | 3.7 km || 
|-id=511 bgcolor=#E9E9E9
| 519511 ||  || — || October 27, 2005 || Kitt Peak || Spacewatch ||  || align=right | 2.2 km || 
|-id=512 bgcolor=#E9E9E9
| 519512 ||  || — || May 3, 2008 || Mount Lemmon || Mount Lemmon Survey ||  || align=right data-sort-value="0.81" | 810 m || 
|-id=513 bgcolor=#d6d6d6
| 519513 ||  || — || March 16, 2012 || Mount Lemmon || Mount Lemmon Survey ||  || align=right | 3.0 km || 
|-id=514 bgcolor=#E9E9E9
| 519514 ||  || — || March 25, 2012 || Kitt Peak || Spacewatch ||  || align=right | 2.2 km || 
|-id=515 bgcolor=#d6d6d6
| 519515 ||  || — || March 27, 2012 || Kitt Peak || Spacewatch ||  || align=right | 2.0 km || 
|-id=516 bgcolor=#fefefe
| 519516 ||  || — || March 14, 2012 || Mount Lemmon || Mount Lemmon Survey ||  || align=right data-sort-value="0.82" | 820 m || 
|-id=517 bgcolor=#d6d6d6
| 519517 ||  || — || February 25, 2006 || Kitt Peak || Spacewatch ||  || align=right | 2.6 km || 
|-id=518 bgcolor=#d6d6d6
| 519518 ||  || — || April 26, 2007 || Kitt Peak || Spacewatch ||  || align=right | 2.3 km || 
|-id=519 bgcolor=#d6d6d6
| 519519 ||  || — || March 15, 2012 || Kitt Peak || Spacewatch ||  || align=right | 2.5 km || 
|-id=520 bgcolor=#d6d6d6
| 519520 ||  || — || March 28, 2012 || Haleakala || Pan-STARRS ||  || align=right | 3.1 km || 
|-id=521 bgcolor=#d6d6d6
| 519521 ||  || — || March 26, 2012 || Mount Lemmon || Mount Lemmon Survey || Tj (2.99) || align=right | 3.2 km || 
|-id=522 bgcolor=#d6d6d6
| 519522 ||  || — || April 15, 2012 || Haleakala || Pan-STARRS ||  || align=right | 3.1 km || 
|-id=523 bgcolor=#d6d6d6
| 519523 ||  || — || April 27, 2012 || Haleakala || Pan-STARRS ||  || align=right | 3.1 km || 
|-id=524 bgcolor=#E9E9E9
| 519524 ||  || — || May 14, 2008 || Mount Lemmon || Mount Lemmon Survey ||  || align=right data-sort-value="0.81" | 810 m || 
|-id=525 bgcolor=#fefefe
| 519525 ||  || — || April 21, 2012 || Kitt Peak || Spacewatch ||  || align=right data-sort-value="0.65" | 650 m || 
|-id=526 bgcolor=#E9E9E9
| 519526 ||  || — || May 3, 2008 || Kitt Peak || Spacewatch ||  || align=right data-sort-value="0.72" | 720 m || 
|-id=527 bgcolor=#d6d6d6
| 519527 ||  || — || January 14, 2011 || Kitt Peak || Spacewatch || Tj (2.98) || align=right | 3.5 km || 
|-id=528 bgcolor=#E9E9E9
| 519528 ||  || — || January 4, 2011 || Mount Lemmon || Mount Lemmon Survey ||  || align=right | 1.2 km || 
|-id=529 bgcolor=#E9E9E9
| 519529 ||  || — || May 14, 2012 || Mount Lemmon || Mount Lemmon Survey ||  || align=right | 1.7 km || 
|-id=530 bgcolor=#fefefe
| 519530 ||  || — || April 27, 2008 || Mount Lemmon || Mount Lemmon Survey ||  || align=right data-sort-value="0.82" | 820 m || 
|-id=531 bgcolor=#E9E9E9
| 519531 ||  || — || March 10, 2007 || Kitt Peak || Spacewatch ||  || align=right | 1.1 km || 
|-id=532 bgcolor=#d6d6d6
| 519532 ||  || — || January 30, 2011 || Haleakala || Pan-STARRS ||  || align=right | 2.6 km || 
|-id=533 bgcolor=#d6d6d6
| 519533 ||  || — || November 26, 2009 || Kitt Peak || Spacewatch ||  || align=right | 2.7 km || 
|-id=534 bgcolor=#E9E9E9
| 519534 ||  || — || December 11, 2010 || Mount Lemmon || Mount Lemmon Survey ||  || align=right | 1.4 km || 
|-id=535 bgcolor=#E9E9E9
| 519535 ||  || — || January 29, 2011 || Mount Lemmon || Mount Lemmon Survey ||  || align=right | 1.4 km || 
|-id=536 bgcolor=#E9E9E9
| 519536 ||  || — || May 23, 2012 || Mount Lemmon || Mount Lemmon Survey ||  || align=right | 1.0 km || 
|-id=537 bgcolor=#E9E9E9
| 519537 ||  || — || January 6, 2010 || Kitt Peak || Spacewatch ||  || align=right | 2.3 km || 
|-id=538 bgcolor=#E9E9E9
| 519538 ||  || — || December 8, 2010 || Mount Lemmon || Mount Lemmon Survey ||  || align=right | 1.5 km || 
|-id=539 bgcolor=#E9E9E9
| 519539 ||  || — || June 15, 2012 || Haleakala || Pan-STARRS ||  || align=right data-sort-value="0.89" | 890 m || 
|-id=540 bgcolor=#E9E9E9
| 519540 ||  || — || June 23, 2012 || Mount Lemmon || Mount Lemmon Survey ||  || align=right | 2.0 km || 
|-id=541 bgcolor=#E9E9E9
| 519541 ||  || — || October 18, 2009 || Mount Lemmon || Mount Lemmon Survey ||  || align=right | 1.0 km || 
|-id=542 bgcolor=#d6d6d6
| 519542 ||  || — || August 10, 2012 || Kitt Peak || Spacewatch ||  || align=right | 2.6 km || 
|-id=543 bgcolor=#E9E9E9
| 519543 ||  || — || February 1, 2006 || Kitt Peak || Spacewatch ||  || align=right | 1.9 km || 
|-id=544 bgcolor=#E9E9E9
| 519544 ||  || — || September 25, 2008 || Mount Lemmon || Mount Lemmon Survey ||  || align=right | 1.6 km || 
|-id=545 bgcolor=#E9E9E9
| 519545 ||  || — || August 14, 2012 || Haleakala || Pan-STARRS ||  || align=right | 1.1 km || 
|-id=546 bgcolor=#E9E9E9
| 519546 ||  || — || August 17, 2012 || Haleakala || Pan-STARRS ||  || align=right | 1.6 km || 
|-id=547 bgcolor=#fefefe
| 519547 ||  || — || December 16, 2009 || Mount Lemmon || Mount Lemmon Survey ||  || align=right data-sort-value="0.85" | 850 m || 
|-id=548 bgcolor=#d6d6d6
| 519548 ||  || — || August 25, 2012 || Kitt Peak || Spacewatch ||  || align=right | 3.4 km || 
|-id=549 bgcolor=#E9E9E9
| 519549 ||  || — || October 26, 2008 || Mount Lemmon || Mount Lemmon Survey ||  || align=right | 1.4 km || 
|-id=550 bgcolor=#d6d6d6
| 519550 ||  || — || July 18, 2006 || Siding Spring || SSS ||  || align=right | 3.2 km || 
|-id=551 bgcolor=#E9E9E9
| 519551 ||  || — || April 27, 2011 || Kitt Peak || Spacewatch ||  || align=right | 2.3 km || 
|-id=552 bgcolor=#d6d6d6
| 519552 ||  || — || August 26, 2012 || Kitt Peak || Spacewatch ||  || align=right | 2.3 km || 
|-id=553 bgcolor=#d6d6d6
| 519553 ||  || — || August 26, 2012 || Kitt Peak || Spacewatch ||  || align=right | 2.8 km || 
|-id=554 bgcolor=#d6d6d6
| 519554 ||  || — || August 26, 2012 || Haleakala || Pan-STARRS ||  || align=right | 1.9 km || 
|-id=555 bgcolor=#d6d6d6
| 519555 ||  || — || August 26, 2012 || Haleakala || Pan-STARRS ||  || align=right | 2.4 km || 
|-id=556 bgcolor=#E9E9E9
| 519556 ||  || — || November 7, 2008 || Mount Lemmon || Mount Lemmon Survey ||  || align=right | 2.2 km || 
|-id=557 bgcolor=#E9E9E9
| 519557 ||  || — || September 30, 2003 || Kitt Peak || Spacewatch ||  || align=right | 2.7 km || 
|-id=558 bgcolor=#E9E9E9
| 519558 ||  || — || September 20, 2003 || Kitt Peak || Spacewatch ||  || align=right | 1.3 km || 
|-id=559 bgcolor=#d6d6d6
| 519559 ||  || — || October 7, 2007 || Kitt Peak || Spacewatch ||  || align=right | 2.5 km || 
|-id=560 bgcolor=#d6d6d6
| 519560 ||  || — || September 14, 2012 || Mount Lemmon || Mount Lemmon Survey ||  || align=right | 2.5 km || 
|-id=561 bgcolor=#E9E9E9
| 519561 ||  || — || September 15, 2012 || Kitt Peak || Spacewatch ||  || align=right | 2.6 km || 
|-id=562 bgcolor=#d6d6d6
| 519562 ||  || — || August 21, 2006 || Kitt Peak || Spacewatch ||  || align=right | 2.6 km || 
|-id=563 bgcolor=#fefefe
| 519563 ||  || — || February 23, 2011 || Kitt Peak || Spacewatch ||  || align=right data-sort-value="0.64" | 640 m || 
|-id=564 bgcolor=#fefefe
| 519564 ||  || — || May 1, 2011 || Haleakala || Pan-STARRS ||  || align=right data-sort-value="0.67" | 670 m || 
|-id=565 bgcolor=#E9E9E9
| 519565 ||  || — || December 29, 2008 || Mount Lemmon || Mount Lemmon Survey ||  || align=right | 2.1 km || 
|-id=566 bgcolor=#d6d6d6
| 519566 ||  || — || September 16, 2012 || Kitt Peak || Spacewatch ||  || align=right | 2.4 km || 
|-id=567 bgcolor=#d6d6d6
| 519567 ||  || — || August 14, 2012 || Haleakala || Pan-STARRS ||  || align=right | 2.5 km || 
|-id=568 bgcolor=#d6d6d6
| 519568 ||  || — || November 8, 2007 || Catalina || CSS ||  || align=right | 2.6 km || 
|-id=569 bgcolor=#E9E9E9
| 519569 ||  || — || September 16, 2012 || Kitt Peak || Spacewatch ||  || align=right | 2.1 km || 
|-id=570 bgcolor=#d6d6d6
| 519570 ||  || — || October 19, 2007 || Catalina || CSS ||  || align=right | 3.3 km || 
|-id=571 bgcolor=#d6d6d6
| 519571 ||  || — || September 19, 2012 || Mount Lemmon || Mount Lemmon Survey ||  || align=right | 2.8 km || 
|-id=572 bgcolor=#E9E9E9
| 519572 ||  || — || September 30, 2003 || Kitt Peak || Spacewatch ||  || align=right | 1.7 km || 
|-id=573 bgcolor=#E9E9E9
| 519573 ||  || — || October 25, 2008 || Kitt Peak || Spacewatch ||  || align=right | 1.1 km || 
|-id=574 bgcolor=#d6d6d6
| 519574 ||  || — || October 12, 2007 || Kitt Peak || Spacewatch ||  || align=right | 2.1 km || 
|-id=575 bgcolor=#E9E9E9
| 519575 ||  || — || September 21, 2012 || Kitt Peak || Spacewatch ||  || align=right | 1.2 km || 
|-id=576 bgcolor=#d6d6d6
| 519576 ||  || — || September 21, 2012 || Mount Lemmon || Mount Lemmon Survey ||  || align=right | 2.3 km || 
|-id=577 bgcolor=#E9E9E9
| 519577 ||  || — || September 23, 2012 || Kitt Peak || Spacewatch ||  || align=right | 1.1 km || 
|-id=578 bgcolor=#E9E9E9
| 519578 ||  || — || April 30, 2006 || Kitt Peak || Spacewatch ||  || align=right | 1.4 km || 
|-id=579 bgcolor=#fefefe
| 519579 ||  || — || October 1, 2005 || Catalina || CSS ||  || align=right data-sort-value="0.82" | 820 m || 
|-id=580 bgcolor=#E9E9E9
| 519580 ||  || — || October 8, 2008 || Mount Lemmon || Mount Lemmon Survey ||  || align=right data-sort-value="0.78" | 780 m || 
|-id=581 bgcolor=#d6d6d6
| 519581 ||  || — || September 25, 2012 || Mount Lemmon || Mount Lemmon Survey ||  || align=right | 2.5 km || 
|-id=582 bgcolor=#d6d6d6
| 519582 ||  || — || April 11, 2005 || Mount Lemmon || Mount Lemmon Survey ||  || align=right | 3.1 km || 
|-id=583 bgcolor=#d6d6d6
| 519583 ||  || — || September 25, 2011 || Haleakala || Pan-STARRS ||  || align=right | 2.7 km || 
|-id=584 bgcolor=#E9E9E9
| 519584 ||  || — || March 18, 2010 || Mount Lemmon || Mount Lemmon Survey ||  || align=right | 1.9 km || 
|-id=585 bgcolor=#fefefe
| 519585 ||  || — || October 11, 2012 || Haleakala || Pan-STARRS ||  || align=right data-sort-value="0.86" | 860 m || 
|-id=586 bgcolor=#fefefe
| 519586 ||  || — || October 11, 2012 || Haleakala || Pan-STARRS ||  || align=right data-sort-value="0.78" | 780 m || 
|-id=587 bgcolor=#fefefe
| 519587 ||  || — || October 10, 2012 || Mount Lemmon || Mount Lemmon Survey ||  || align=right | 1.0 km || 
|-id=588 bgcolor=#d6d6d6
| 519588 ||  || — || October 9, 2007 || Kitt Peak || Spacewatch ||  || align=right | 2.1 km || 
|-id=589 bgcolor=#d6d6d6
| 519589 ||  || — || October 10, 2007 || Catalina || CSS ||  || align=right | 2.6 km || 
|-id=590 bgcolor=#d6d6d6
| 519590 ||  || — || October 8, 2012 || Mount Lemmon || Mount Lemmon Survey ||  || align=right | 2.1 km || 
|-id=591 bgcolor=#d6d6d6
| 519591 ||  || — || October 8, 2012 || Kitt Peak || Spacewatch ||  || align=right | 2.4 km || 
|-id=592 bgcolor=#d6d6d6
| 519592 ||  || — || October 8, 2012 || Kitt Peak || Spacewatch ||  || align=right | 1.9 km || 
|-id=593 bgcolor=#d6d6d6
| 519593 ||  || — || October 8, 2012 || Kitt Peak || Spacewatch ||  || align=right | 2.7 km || 
|-id=594 bgcolor=#E9E9E9
| 519594 ||  || — || October 8, 2012 || Kitt Peak || Spacewatch ||  || align=right | 2.4 km || 
|-id=595 bgcolor=#E9E9E9
| 519595 ||  || — || November 6, 2008 || Kitt Peak || Spacewatch ||  || align=right | 1.2 km || 
|-id=596 bgcolor=#d6d6d6
| 519596 ||  || — || September 18, 2012 || Mount Lemmon || Mount Lemmon Survey ||  || align=right | 3.2 km || 
|-id=597 bgcolor=#E9E9E9
| 519597 ||  || — || April 6, 2011 || Kitt Peak || Spacewatch ||  || align=right | 1.4 km || 
|-id=598 bgcolor=#d6d6d6
| 519598 ||  || — || October 8, 2012 || Mount Lemmon || Mount Lemmon Survey ||  || align=right | 2.7 km || 
|-id=599 bgcolor=#d6d6d6
| 519599 ||  || — || October 9, 2012 || Mount Lemmon || Mount Lemmon Survey ||  || align=right | 1.9 km || 
|-id=600 bgcolor=#E9E9E9
| 519600 ||  || — || October 10, 2012 || Haleakala || Pan-STARRS ||  || align=right | 1.1 km || 
|}

519601–519700 

|-bgcolor=#d6d6d6
| 519601 ||  || — || October 11, 2012 || Haleakala || Pan-STARRS ||  || align=right | 2.7 km || 
|-id=602 bgcolor=#fefefe
| 519602 ||  || — || October 13, 2012 || Kitt Peak || Spacewatch ||  || align=right data-sort-value="0.91" | 910 m || 
|-id=603 bgcolor=#E9E9E9
| 519603 ||  || — || October 11, 2012 || Mount Lemmon || Mount Lemmon Survey ||  || align=right | 1.1 km || 
|-id=604 bgcolor=#d6d6d6
| 519604 ||  || — || November 5, 2007 || Kitt Peak || Spacewatch ||  || align=right | 2.9 km || 
|-id=605 bgcolor=#d6d6d6
| 519605 ||  || — || November 14, 2007 || Kitt Peak || Spacewatch ||  || align=right | 2.2 km || 
|-id=606 bgcolor=#d6d6d6
| 519606 ||  || — || October 10, 2007 || Mount Lemmon || Mount Lemmon Survey ||  || align=right | 2.5 km || 
|-id=607 bgcolor=#E9E9E9
| 519607 ||  || — || April 8, 2006 || Kitt Peak || Spacewatch ||  || align=right | 2.8 km || 
|-id=608 bgcolor=#fefefe
| 519608 ||  || — || October 27, 2005 || Kitt Peak || Spacewatch || V || align=right data-sort-value="0.65" | 650 m || 
|-id=609 bgcolor=#E9E9E9
| 519609 ||  || — || December 18, 2004 || Kitt Peak || Spacewatch ||  || align=right | 1.7 km || 
|-id=610 bgcolor=#FA8072
| 519610 ||  || — || October 6, 2012 || Kitt Peak || Spacewatch ||  || align=right data-sort-value="0.68" | 680 m || 
|-id=611 bgcolor=#d6d6d6
| 519611 ||  || — || November 5, 2007 || Kitt Peak || Spacewatch ||  || align=right | 2.1 km || 
|-id=612 bgcolor=#d6d6d6
| 519612 ||  || — || November 17, 2007 || Kitt Peak || Spacewatch ||  || align=right | 3.0 km || 
|-id=613 bgcolor=#E9E9E9
| 519613 ||  || — || October 17, 2012 || Haleakala || Pan-STARRS ||  || align=right | 1.4 km || 
|-id=614 bgcolor=#E9E9E9
| 519614 ||  || — || October 17, 2012 || Haleakala || Pan-STARRS ||  || align=right | 1.7 km || 
|-id=615 bgcolor=#d6d6d6
| 519615 ||  || — || March 26, 2004 || Kitt Peak || Spacewatch ||  || align=right | 2.6 km || 
|-id=616 bgcolor=#d6d6d6
| 519616 ||  || — || September 15, 2006 || Kitt Peak || Spacewatch ||  || align=right | 2.5 km || 
|-id=617 bgcolor=#d6d6d6
| 519617 ||  || — || October 9, 2007 || Mount Lemmon || Mount Lemmon Survey ||  || align=right | 1.9 km || 
|-id=618 bgcolor=#E9E9E9
| 519618 ||  || — || October 18, 2012 || Haleakala || Pan-STARRS ||  || align=right | 1.9 km || 
|-id=619 bgcolor=#d6d6d6
| 519619 ||  || — || October 30, 2007 || Kitt Peak || Spacewatch ||  || align=right | 2.4 km || 
|-id=620 bgcolor=#E9E9E9
| 519620 ||  || — || October 18, 2012 || Haleakala || Pan-STARRS ||  || align=right | 1.1 km || 
|-id=621 bgcolor=#d6d6d6
| 519621 ||  || — || October 18, 2012 || Haleakala || Pan-STARRS ||  || align=right | 2.3 km || 
|-id=622 bgcolor=#d6d6d6
| 519622 ||  || — || October 18, 2012 || Haleakala || Pan-STARRS ||  || align=right | 2.5 km || 
|-id=623 bgcolor=#d6d6d6
| 519623 ||  || — || October 18, 2012 || Haleakala || Pan-STARRS ||  || align=right | 2.5 km || 
|-id=624 bgcolor=#d6d6d6
| 519624 ||  || — || August 2, 2011 || Haleakala || Pan-STARRS ||  || align=right | 2.5 km || 
|-id=625 bgcolor=#d6d6d6
| 519625 ||  || — || March 23, 2003 || Kitt Peak || Spacewatch ||  || align=right | 2.5 km || 
|-id=626 bgcolor=#E9E9E9
| 519626 ||  || — || October 19, 2012 || Haleakala || Pan-STARRS ||  || align=right | 2.0 km || 
|-id=627 bgcolor=#d6d6d6
| 519627 ||  || — || October 20, 2012 || Haleakala || Pan-STARRS ||  || align=right | 2.8 km || 
|-id=628 bgcolor=#d6d6d6
| 519628 ||  || — || February 10, 2008 || Kitt Peak || Spacewatch ||  || align=right | 2.9 km || 
|-id=629 bgcolor=#d6d6d6
| 519629 ||  || — || February 19, 2009 || Kitt Peak || Spacewatch ||  || align=right | 2.3 km || 
|-id=630 bgcolor=#d6d6d6
| 519630 ||  || — || October 12, 2006 || Kitt Peak || Spacewatch ||  || align=right | 3.7 km || 
|-id=631 bgcolor=#E9E9E9
| 519631 ||  || — || May 24, 2011 || Haleakala || Pan-STARRS ||  || align=right | 1.3 km || 
|-id=632 bgcolor=#E9E9E9
| 519632 ||  || — || October 7, 2008 || Mount Lemmon || Mount Lemmon Survey ||  || align=right | 1.0 km || 
|-id=633 bgcolor=#d6d6d6
| 519633 ||  || — || December 5, 2007 || Kitt Peak || Spacewatch ||  || align=right | 3.3 km || 
|-id=634 bgcolor=#d6d6d6
| 519634 ||  || — || November 13, 2007 || Kitt Peak || Spacewatch ||  || align=right | 2.1 km || 
|-id=635 bgcolor=#E9E9E9
| 519635 ||  || — || October 21, 2012 || Haleakala || Pan-STARRS ||  || align=right | 1.9 km || 
|-id=636 bgcolor=#d6d6d6
| 519636 ||  || — || January 31, 2009 || Kitt Peak || Spacewatch ||  || align=right | 2.4 km || 
|-id=637 bgcolor=#fefefe
| 519637 ||  || — || October 6, 2008 || Mount Lemmon || Mount Lemmon Survey ||  || align=right data-sort-value="0.90" | 900 m || 
|-id=638 bgcolor=#E9E9E9
| 519638 ||  || — || January 19, 2005 || Kitt Peak || Spacewatch ||  || align=right | 1.6 km || 
|-id=639 bgcolor=#E9E9E9
| 519639 ||  || — || October 21, 2012 || Haleakala || Pan-STARRS ||  || align=right | 1.7 km || 
|-id=640 bgcolor=#d6d6d6
| 519640 ||  || — || October 13, 2012 || Kitt Peak || Spacewatch ||  || align=right | 3.2 km || 
|-id=641 bgcolor=#E9E9E9
| 519641 ||  || — || October 15, 2012 || Mount Lemmon || Mount Lemmon Survey ||  || align=right | 2.1 km || 
|-id=642 bgcolor=#E9E9E9
| 519642 ||  || — || March 20, 2010 || Kitt Peak || Spacewatch ||  || align=right | 1.4 km || 
|-id=643 bgcolor=#E9E9E9
| 519643 ||  || — || October 16, 2003 || Kitt Peak || Spacewatch ||  || align=right | 1.3 km || 
|-id=644 bgcolor=#E9E9E9
| 519644 ||  || — || October 10, 2012 || Kitt Peak || Spacewatch ||  || align=right | 2.1 km || 
|-id=645 bgcolor=#E9E9E9
| 519645 ||  || — || October 22, 2012 || Haleakala || Pan-STARRS ||  || align=right | 2.1 km || 
|-id=646 bgcolor=#E9E9E9
| 519646 ||  || — || October 23, 2012 || Haleakala || Pan-STARRS ||  || align=right | 1.4 km || 
|-id=647 bgcolor=#d6d6d6
| 519647 ||  || — || November 3, 2007 || Kitt Peak || Spacewatch ||  || align=right | 2.3 km || 
|-id=648 bgcolor=#d6d6d6
| 519648 ||  || — || October 26, 2012 || Mount Lemmon || Mount Lemmon Survey ||  || align=right | 3.4 km || 
|-id=649 bgcolor=#fefefe
| 519649 ||  || — || April 15, 2007 || Kitt Peak || Spacewatch ||  || align=right data-sort-value="0.68" | 680 m || 
|-id=650 bgcolor=#fefefe
| 519650 ||  || — || October 20, 2012 || Haleakala || Pan-STARRS ||  || align=right | 1.00 km || 
|-id=651 bgcolor=#E9E9E9
| 519651 ||  || — || October 25, 2012 || Kitt Peak || Spacewatch ||  || align=right | 1.3 km || 
|-id=652 bgcolor=#fefefe
| 519652 ||  || — || October 21, 2012 || Haleakala || Pan-STARRS ||  || align=right data-sort-value="0.87" | 870 m || 
|-id=653 bgcolor=#E9E9E9
| 519653 ||  || — || January 29, 2009 || Catalina || CSS ||  || align=right | 1.9 km || 
|-id=654 bgcolor=#d6d6d6
| 519654 ||  || — || November 6, 2012 || Kitt Peak || Spacewatch ||  || align=right | 2.9 km || 
|-id=655 bgcolor=#E9E9E9
| 519655 ||  || — || March 19, 2010 || Kitt Peak || Spacewatch ||  || align=right data-sort-value="0.95" | 950 m || 
|-id=656 bgcolor=#d6d6d6
| 519656 ||  || — || December 19, 2007 || Kitt Peak || Spacewatch ||  || align=right | 2.1 km || 
|-id=657 bgcolor=#E9E9E9
| 519657 ||  || — || October 11, 2007 || Mount Lemmon || Mount Lemmon Survey ||  || align=right | 1.8 km || 
|-id=658 bgcolor=#d6d6d6
| 519658 ||  || — || November 19, 2012 || Kitt Peak || Spacewatch ||  || align=right | 3.7 km || 
|-id=659 bgcolor=#d6d6d6
| 519659 ||  || — || April 9, 2010 || Kitt Peak || Spacewatch ||  || align=right | 2.7 km || 
|-id=660 bgcolor=#d6d6d6
| 519660 ||  || — || August 28, 2006 || Kitt Peak || Spacewatch ||  || align=right | 2.2 km || 
|-id=661 bgcolor=#E9E9E9
| 519661 ||  || — || October 19, 2007 || Catalina || CSS ||  || align=right | 3.1 km || 
|-id=662 bgcolor=#E9E9E9
| 519662 ||  || — || September 12, 2007 || Mount Lemmon || Mount Lemmon Survey ||  || align=right | 1.3 km || 
|-id=663 bgcolor=#E9E9E9
| 519663 ||  || — || October 26, 2012 || Mount Lemmon || Mount Lemmon Survey ||  || align=right | 2.1 km || 
|-id=664 bgcolor=#E9E9E9
| 519664 ||  || — || November 30, 2008 || Kitt Peak || Spacewatch ||  || align=right data-sort-value="0.66" | 660 m || 
|-id=665 bgcolor=#d6d6d6
| 519665 ||  || — || December 7, 2012 || Mount Lemmon || Mount Lemmon Survey ||  || align=right | 2.2 km || 
|-id=666 bgcolor=#E9E9E9
| 519666 ||  || — || December 8, 2012 || Kitt Peak || Spacewatch ||  || align=right | 1.3 km || 
|-id=667 bgcolor=#d6d6d6
| 519667 ||  || — || September 4, 2011 || Haleakala || Pan-STARRS ||  || align=right | 2.4 km || 
|-id=668 bgcolor=#E9E9E9
| 519668 ||  || — || December 21, 2012 || Mount Lemmon || Mount Lemmon Survey ||  || align=right | 2.6 km || 
|-id=669 bgcolor=#E9E9E9
| 519669 ||  || — || October 16, 2007 || Kitt Peak || Spacewatch ||  || align=right | 1.4 km || 
|-id=670 bgcolor=#E9E9E9
| 519670 ||  || — || February 20, 2009 || Kitt Peak || Spacewatch ||  || align=right | 1.9 km || 
|-id=671 bgcolor=#d6d6d6
| 519671 ||  || — || December 22, 2012 || Haleakala || Pan-STARRS ||  || align=right | 2.9 km || 
|-id=672 bgcolor=#d6d6d6
| 519672 ||  || — || December 3, 2007 || Kitt Peak || Spacewatch ||  || align=right | 2.1 km || 
|-id=673 bgcolor=#E9E9E9
| 519673 ||  || — || October 12, 2007 || Kitt Peak || Spacewatch ||  || align=right | 1.0 km || 
|-id=674 bgcolor=#fefefe
| 519674 ||  || — || December 23, 2012 || Haleakala || Pan-STARRS ||  || align=right data-sort-value="0.80" | 800 m || 
|-id=675 bgcolor=#d6d6d6
| 519675 ||  || — || September 2, 2011 || Haleakala || Pan-STARRS ||  || align=right | 2.2 km || 
|-id=676 bgcolor=#d6d6d6
| 519676 ||  || — || July 5, 2010 || Kitt Peak || Spacewatch ||  || align=right | 2.9 km || 
|-id=677 bgcolor=#d6d6d6
| 519677 ||  || — || December 23, 2012 || Haleakala || Pan-STARRS ||  || align=right | 2.1 km || 
|-id=678 bgcolor=#d6d6d6
| 519678 ||  || — || January 13, 2008 || Mount Lemmon || Mount Lemmon Survey ||  || align=right | 2.8 km || 
|-id=679 bgcolor=#E9E9E9
| 519679 ||  || — || November 5, 2012 || Kitt Peak || Spacewatch ||  || align=right | 1.5 km || 
|-id=680 bgcolor=#E9E9E9
| 519680 ||  || — || January 5, 2013 || Mount Lemmon || Mount Lemmon Survey ||  || align=right | 1.5 km || 
|-id=681 bgcolor=#d6d6d6
| 519681 ||  || — || January 7, 2013 || Mount Lemmon || Mount Lemmon Survey ||  || align=right | 2.7 km || 
|-id=682 bgcolor=#E9E9E9
| 519682 ||  || — || February 4, 2009 || Mount Lemmon || Mount Lemmon Survey ||  || align=right | 1.9 km || 
|-id=683 bgcolor=#E9E9E9
| 519683 ||  || — || December 22, 2012 || Haleakala || Pan-STARRS ||  || align=right | 1.0 km || 
|-id=684 bgcolor=#E9E9E9
| 519684 ||  || — || November 6, 2007 || Kitt Peak || Spacewatch ||  || align=right | 1.9 km || 
|-id=685 bgcolor=#d6d6d6
| 519685 ||  || — || January 13, 2013 || Mount Lemmon || Mount Lemmon Survey ||  || align=right | 2.5 km || 
|-id=686 bgcolor=#d6d6d6
| 519686 ||  || — || March 25, 2008 || Kitt Peak || Spacewatch ||  || align=right | 2.9 km || 
|-id=687 bgcolor=#d6d6d6
| 519687 ||  || — || October 20, 2006 || Kitt Peak || Spacewatch ||  || align=right | 2.2 km || 
|-id=688 bgcolor=#d6d6d6
| 519688 ||  || — || September 19, 2011 || Haleakala || Pan-STARRS ||  || align=right | 2.1 km || 
|-id=689 bgcolor=#d6d6d6
| 519689 ||  || — || January 3, 2013 || Mount Lemmon || Mount Lemmon Survey ||  || align=right | 3.0 km || 
|-id=690 bgcolor=#d6d6d6
| 519690 ||  || — || January 5, 2013 || Kitt Peak || Spacewatch ||  || align=right | 2.5 km || 
|-id=691 bgcolor=#E9E9E9
| 519691 ||  || — || September 23, 2011 || Kitt Peak || Spacewatch ||  || align=right | 2.2 km || 
|-id=692 bgcolor=#d6d6d6
| 519692 ||  || — || January 5, 2013 || Mount Lemmon || Mount Lemmon Survey ||  || align=right | 2.3 km || 
|-id=693 bgcolor=#E9E9E9
| 519693 ||  || — || November 18, 2007 || Mount Lemmon || Mount Lemmon Survey ||  || align=right | 1.9 km || 
|-id=694 bgcolor=#E9E9E9
| 519694 ||  || — || January 8, 2013 || Kitt Peak || Spacewatch ||  || align=right | 2.2 km || 
|-id=695 bgcolor=#d6d6d6
| 519695 ||  || — || January 17, 2007 || Kitt Peak || Spacewatch ||  || align=right | 2.3 km || 
|-id=696 bgcolor=#E9E9E9
| 519696 ||  || — || October 20, 2007 || Mount Lemmon || Mount Lemmon Survey ||  || align=right | 1.4 km || 
|-id=697 bgcolor=#d6d6d6
| 519697 ||  || — || February 10, 2008 || Kitt Peak || Spacewatch ||  || align=right | 2.2 km || 
|-id=698 bgcolor=#E9E9E9
| 519698 ||  || — || October 18, 2011 || Mount Lemmon || Mount Lemmon Survey ||  || align=right | 1.6 km || 
|-id=699 bgcolor=#d6d6d6
| 519699 ||  || — || September 21, 2011 || Kitt Peak || Spacewatch ||  || align=right | 1.9 km || 
|-id=700 bgcolor=#d6d6d6
| 519700 ||  || — || January 10, 2013 || Haleakala || Pan-STARRS ||  || align=right | 2.2 km || 
|}

519701–519800 

|-bgcolor=#E9E9E9
| 519701 ||  || — || January 10, 2013 || Haleakala || Pan-STARRS ||  || align=right | 1.5 km || 
|-id=702 bgcolor=#d6d6d6
| 519702 ||  || — || January 10, 2013 || Haleakala || Pan-STARRS ||  || align=right | 1.9 km || 
|-id=703 bgcolor=#d6d6d6
| 519703 ||  || — || January 10, 2013 || Haleakala || Pan-STARRS ||  || align=right | 2.5 km || 
|-id=704 bgcolor=#d6d6d6
| 519704 ||  || — || January 10, 2013 || Haleakala || Pan-STARRS ||  || align=right | 1.9 km || 
|-id=705 bgcolor=#E9E9E9
| 519705 ||  || — || November 2, 2007 || Kitt Peak || Spacewatch ||  || align=right | 1.7 km || 
|-id=706 bgcolor=#E9E9E9
| 519706 ||  || — || March 18, 2009 || Kitt Peak || Spacewatch ||  || align=right | 1.4 km || 
|-id=707 bgcolor=#d6d6d6
| 519707 ||  || — || February 28, 2008 || Kitt Peak || Spacewatch ||  || align=right | 2.3 km || 
|-id=708 bgcolor=#E9E9E9
| 519708 ||  || — || June 19, 2010 || Mount Lemmon || Mount Lemmon Survey ||  || align=right | 1.8 km || 
|-id=709 bgcolor=#d6d6d6
| 519709 ||  || — || February 13, 2008 || Mount Lemmon || Mount Lemmon Survey ||  || align=right | 2.6 km || 
|-id=710 bgcolor=#d6d6d6
| 519710 ||  || — || March 26, 2004 || Kitt Peak || Spacewatch ||  || align=right | 3.2 km || 
|-id=711 bgcolor=#E9E9E9
| 519711 ||  || — || September 19, 2011 || Haleakala || Pan-STARRS ||  || align=right | 1.6 km || 
|-id=712 bgcolor=#E9E9E9
| 519712 ||  || — || January 5, 2013 || Mount Lemmon || Mount Lemmon Survey ||  || align=right | 1.7 km || 
|-id=713 bgcolor=#E9E9E9
| 519713 ||  || — || November 9, 2007 || Kitt Peak || Spacewatch ||  || align=right | 2.0 km || 
|-id=714 bgcolor=#E9E9E9
| 519714 ||  || — || March 3, 2009 || Catalina || CSS ||  || align=right | 1.3 km || 
|-id=715 bgcolor=#d6d6d6
| 519715 ||  || — || March 5, 2008 || Kitt Peak || Spacewatch ||  || align=right | 2.9 km || 
|-id=716 bgcolor=#d6d6d6
| 519716 ||  || — || January 9, 2013 || Kitt Peak || Spacewatch ||  || align=right | 2.7 km || 
|-id=717 bgcolor=#d6d6d6
| 519717 ||  || — || February 13, 2008 || Mount Lemmon || Mount Lemmon Survey ||  || align=right | 2.2 km || 
|-id=718 bgcolor=#E9E9E9
| 519718 ||  || — || December 5, 2007 || Kitt Peak || Spacewatch ||  || align=right | 1.9 km || 
|-id=719 bgcolor=#d6d6d6
| 519719 ||  || — || January 19, 2013 || Mount Lemmon || Mount Lemmon Survey ||  || align=right | 2.4 km || 
|-id=720 bgcolor=#d6d6d6
| 519720 ||  || — || January 17, 2007 || Catalina || CSS ||  || align=right | 2.8 km || 
|-id=721 bgcolor=#d6d6d6
| 519721 ||  || — || September 5, 2010 || Mount Lemmon || Mount Lemmon Survey ||  || align=right | 2.1 km || 
|-id=722 bgcolor=#d6d6d6
| 519722 ||  || — || October 24, 2011 || Haleakala || Pan-STARRS ||  || align=right | 2.2 km || 
|-id=723 bgcolor=#d6d6d6
| 519723 ||  || — || February 13, 2008 || Kitt Peak || Spacewatch ||  || align=right | 2.7 km || 
|-id=724 bgcolor=#E9E9E9
| 519724 ||  || — || January 10, 2013 || Haleakala || Pan-STARRS ||  || align=right | 1.3 km || 
|-id=725 bgcolor=#d6d6d6
| 519725 ||  || — || September 24, 2011 || Haleakala || Pan-STARRS ||  || align=right | 2.8 km || 
|-id=726 bgcolor=#E9E9E9
| 519726 ||  || — || January 5, 2013 || Mount Lemmon || Mount Lemmon Survey || JUN || align=right data-sort-value="0.88" | 880 m || 
|-id=727 bgcolor=#E9E9E9
| 519727 ||  || — || September 25, 2011 || Haleakala || Pan-STARRS ||  || align=right | 1.6 km || 
|-id=728 bgcolor=#d6d6d6
| 519728 ||  || — || October 1, 2011 || Mount Lemmon || Mount Lemmon Survey ||  || align=right | 2.7 km || 
|-id=729 bgcolor=#E9E9E9
| 519729 ||  || — || July 10, 2010 || WISE || WISE || CLO || align=right | 3.4 km || 
|-id=730 bgcolor=#E9E9E9
| 519730 ||  || — || May 15, 2009 || Kitt Peak || Spacewatch ||  || align=right | 2.0 km || 
|-id=731 bgcolor=#E9E9E9
| 519731 ||  || — || December 18, 2007 || Kitt Peak || Spacewatch ||  || align=right | 2.0 km || 
|-id=732 bgcolor=#E9E9E9
| 519732 ||  || — || October 21, 2011 || Mount Lemmon || Mount Lemmon Survey ||  || align=right | 1.4 km || 
|-id=733 bgcolor=#E9E9E9
| 519733 ||  || — || February 15, 2013 || Haleakala || Pan-STARRS ||  || align=right | 1.6 km || 
|-id=734 bgcolor=#d6d6d6
| 519734 ||  || — || February 5, 2013 || Kitt Peak || Spacewatch ||  || align=right | 2.4 km || 
|-id=735 bgcolor=#E9E9E9
| 519735 ||  || — || July 22, 2006 || Mount Lemmon || Mount Lemmon Survey ||  || align=right | 1.9 km || 
|-id=736 bgcolor=#d6d6d6
| 519736 ||  || — || August 30, 2005 || Kitt Peak || Spacewatch ||  || align=right | 2.8 km || 
|-id=737 bgcolor=#d6d6d6
| 519737 ||  || — || July 28, 2009 || Catalina || CSS ||  || align=right | 3.2 km || 
|-id=738 bgcolor=#d6d6d6
| 519738 ||  || — || September 13, 2005 || Kitt Peak || Spacewatch ||  || align=right | 2.6 km || 
|-id=739 bgcolor=#d6d6d6
| 519739 ||  || — || March 29, 2008 || Kitt Peak || Spacewatch ||  || align=right | 2.2 km || 
|-id=740 bgcolor=#d6d6d6
| 519740 ||  || — || August 23, 2004 || Kitt Peak || Spacewatch ||  || align=right | 2.4 km || 
|-id=741 bgcolor=#E9E9E9
| 519741 ||  || — || April 1, 2009 || Mount Lemmon || Mount Lemmon Survey ||  || align=right | 1.4 km || 
|-id=742 bgcolor=#E9E9E9
| 519742 ||  || — || September 17, 2006 || Kitt Peak || Spacewatch ||  || align=right | 1.6 km || 
|-id=743 bgcolor=#d6d6d6
| 519743 ||  || — || March 1, 2008 || Kitt Peak || Spacewatch ||  || align=right | 2.4 km || 
|-id=744 bgcolor=#E9E9E9
| 519744 ||  || — || February 8, 2013 || Haleakala || Pan-STARRS ||  || align=right | 1.7 km || 
|-id=745 bgcolor=#d6d6d6
| 519745 ||  || — || October 18, 2011 || Haleakala || Pan-STARRS ||  || align=right | 2.6 km || 
|-id=746 bgcolor=#d6d6d6
| 519746 ||  || — || November 2, 2010 || Mount Lemmon || Mount Lemmon Survey ||  || align=right | 3.2 km || 
|-id=747 bgcolor=#d6d6d6
| 519747 ||  || — || November 20, 2004 || Kitt Peak || Spacewatch ||  || align=right | 3.6 km || 
|-id=748 bgcolor=#E9E9E9
| 519748 ||  || — || February 19, 2009 || Kitt Peak || Spacewatch ||  || align=right data-sort-value="0.74" | 740 m || 
|-id=749 bgcolor=#d6d6d6
| 519749 ||  || — || September 29, 2011 || Kitt Peak || Spacewatch ||  || align=right | 2.8 km || 
|-id=750 bgcolor=#d6d6d6
| 519750 ||  || — || February 15, 2013 || Haleakala || Pan-STARRS ||  || align=right | 2.2 km || 
|-id=751 bgcolor=#E9E9E9
| 519751 ||  || — || August 20, 2006 || Kitt Peak || Spacewatch ||  || align=right | 1.6 km || 
|-id=752 bgcolor=#E9E9E9
| 519752 ||  || — || September 27, 2006 || Kitt Peak || Spacewatch ||  || align=right | 2.0 km || 
|-id=753 bgcolor=#d6d6d6
| 519753 ||  || — || February 15, 2013 || Haleakala || Pan-STARRS ||  || align=right | 2.0 km || 
|-id=754 bgcolor=#d6d6d6
| 519754 ||  || — || January 27, 2007 || Kitt Peak || Spacewatch ||  || align=right | 3.0 km || 
|-id=755 bgcolor=#d6d6d6
| 519755 ||  || — || September 4, 2011 || Haleakala || Pan-STARRS ||  || align=right | 1.9 km || 
|-id=756 bgcolor=#E9E9E9
| 519756 ||  || — || August 28, 2006 || Kitt Peak || Spacewatch ||  || align=right | 2.4 km || 
|-id=757 bgcolor=#E9E9E9
| 519757 ||  || — || February 16, 2013 || Mount Lemmon || Mount Lemmon Survey ||  || align=right | 1.3 km || 
|-id=758 bgcolor=#d6d6d6
| 519758 ||  || — || January 10, 2007 || Mount Lemmon || Mount Lemmon Survey ||  || align=right | 2.6 km || 
|-id=759 bgcolor=#d6d6d6
| 519759 ||  || — || September 10, 2010 || Kitt Peak || Spacewatch ||  || align=right | 2.3 km || 
|-id=760 bgcolor=#d6d6d6
| 519760 ||  || — || February 17, 2013 || Kitt Peak || Spacewatch ||  || align=right | 2.4 km || 
|-id=761 bgcolor=#d6d6d6
| 519761 ||  || — || February 18, 2013 || Kitt Peak || Spacewatch ||  || align=right | 2.3 km || 
|-id=762 bgcolor=#E9E9E9
| 519762 ||  || — || May 15, 2009 || Catalina || CSS ||  || align=right | 2.2 km || 
|-id=763 bgcolor=#E9E9E9
| 519763 ||  || — || October 26, 2011 || Haleakala || Pan-STARRS ||  || align=right | 1.2 km || 
|-id=764 bgcolor=#E9E9E9
| 519764 ||  || — || January 19, 2008 || Mount Lemmon || Mount Lemmon Survey || DOR || align=right | 1.9 km || 
|-id=765 bgcolor=#E9E9E9
| 519765 ||  || — || April 22, 2004 || Campo Imperatore || CINEOS ||  || align=right | 2.0 km || 
|-id=766 bgcolor=#E9E9E9
| 519766 ||  || — || October 3, 2006 || Mount Lemmon || Mount Lemmon Survey ||  || align=right | 1.9 km || 
|-id=767 bgcolor=#d6d6d6
| 519767 ||  || — || August 31, 2005 || Kitt Peak || Spacewatch ||  || align=right | 2.0 km || 
|-id=768 bgcolor=#d6d6d6
| 519768 ||  || — || January 1, 2012 || Mount Lemmon || Mount Lemmon Survey ||  || align=right | 2.9 km || 
|-id=769 bgcolor=#E9E9E9
| 519769 ||  || — || September 30, 2010 || Mount Lemmon || Mount Lemmon Survey ||  || align=right | 1.8 km || 
|-id=770 bgcolor=#E9E9E9
| 519770 ||  || — || November 8, 2007 || Kitt Peak || Spacewatch ||  || align=right | 1.2 km || 
|-id=771 bgcolor=#E9E9E9
| 519771 ||  || — || March 5, 2013 || Haleakala || Pan-STARRS ||  || align=right | 1.2 km || 
|-id=772 bgcolor=#d6d6d6
| 519772 ||  || — || March 5, 2013 || Haleakala || Pan-STARRS ||  || align=right | 2.4 km || 
|-id=773 bgcolor=#d6d6d6
| 519773 ||  || — || January 27, 2007 || Mount Lemmon || Mount Lemmon Survey ||  || align=right | 2.8 km || 
|-id=774 bgcolor=#d6d6d6
| 519774 ||  || — || April 1, 2008 || Kitt Peak || Spacewatch ||  || align=right | 2.2 km || 
|-id=775 bgcolor=#d6d6d6
| 519775 ||  || — || February 21, 2007 || Kitt Peak || Spacewatch ||  || align=right | 2.8 km || 
|-id=776 bgcolor=#d6d6d6
| 519776 ||  || — || April 4, 2008 || Mount Lemmon || Mount Lemmon Survey ||  || align=right | 2.5 km || 
|-id=777 bgcolor=#d6d6d6
| 519777 ||  || — || October 27, 2005 || Kitt Peak || Spacewatch ||  || align=right | 2.3 km || 
|-id=778 bgcolor=#d6d6d6
| 519778 ||  || — || October 26, 2005 || Kitt Peak || Spacewatch ||  || align=right | 2.2 km || 
|-id=779 bgcolor=#d6d6d6
| 519779 ||  || — || March 30, 2008 || Kitt Peak || Spacewatch ||  || align=right | 2.2 km || 
|-id=780 bgcolor=#d6d6d6
| 519780 ||  || — || May 3, 2008 || Mount Lemmon || Mount Lemmon Survey ||  || align=right | 2.4 km || 
|-id=781 bgcolor=#d6d6d6
| 519781 ||  || — || October 5, 2005 || Kitt Peak || Spacewatch ||  || align=right | 2.7 km || 
|-id=782 bgcolor=#E9E9E9
| 519782 ||  || — || February 6, 2008 || Catalina || CSS ||  || align=right | 1.9 km || 
|-id=783 bgcolor=#FA8072
| 519783 ||  || — || March 5, 2013 || Haleakala || Pan-STARRS ||  || align=right | 2.2 km || 
|-id=784 bgcolor=#d6d6d6
| 519784 ||  || — || October 17, 2010 || Mount Lemmon || Mount Lemmon Survey ||  || align=right | 2.8 km || 
|-id=785 bgcolor=#E9E9E9
| 519785 ||  || — || March 15, 2004 || Kitt Peak || Spacewatch ||  || align=right | 1.4 km || 
|-id=786 bgcolor=#E9E9E9
| 519786 ||  || — || September 28, 2006 || Kitt Peak || Spacewatch ||  || align=right data-sort-value="0.94" | 940 m || 
|-id=787 bgcolor=#E9E9E9
| 519787 ||  || — || March 11, 2013 || Mount Lemmon || Mount Lemmon Survey ||  || align=right | 2.0 km || 
|-id=788 bgcolor=#d6d6d6
| 519788 ||  || — || October 12, 2010 || Mount Lemmon || Mount Lemmon Survey ||  || align=right | 2.7 km || 
|-id=789 bgcolor=#d6d6d6
| 519789 ||  || — || April 3, 2008 || Mount Lemmon || Mount Lemmon Survey || BRA || align=right | 1.1 km || 
|-id=790 bgcolor=#d6d6d6
| 519790 ||  || — || January 2, 2012 || Mount Lemmon || Mount Lemmon Survey ||  || align=right | 2.2 km || 
|-id=791 bgcolor=#E9E9E9
| 519791 ||  || — || March 13, 2013 || Kitt Peak || Spacewatch ||  || align=right | 2.0 km || 
|-id=792 bgcolor=#fefefe
| 519792 ||  || — || April 2, 2013 || Haleakala || Pan-STARRS || H || align=right data-sort-value="0.62" | 620 m || 
|-id=793 bgcolor=#fefefe
| 519793 ||  || — || April 10, 2013 || Mount Lemmon || Mount Lemmon Survey ||  || align=right data-sort-value="0.87" | 870 m || 
|-id=794 bgcolor=#E9E9E9
| 519794 ||  || — || October 14, 2010 || Mount Lemmon || Mount Lemmon Survey ||  || align=right | 1.9 km || 
|-id=795 bgcolor=#d6d6d6
| 519795 ||  || — || April 11, 2013 || Kitt Peak || Spacewatch ||  || align=right | 2.6 km || 
|-id=796 bgcolor=#d6d6d6
| 519796 ||  || — || December 2, 2010 || Mount Lemmon || Mount Lemmon Survey ||  || align=right | 2.1 km || 
|-id=797 bgcolor=#d6d6d6
| 519797 ||  || — || April 30, 2008 || Mount Lemmon || Mount Lemmon Survey ||  || align=right | 2.6 km || 
|-id=798 bgcolor=#E9E9E9
| 519798 ||  || — || April 11, 2013 || Kitt Peak || Spacewatch ||  || align=right | 1.4 km || 
|-id=799 bgcolor=#d6d6d6
| 519799 ||  || — || December 14, 2010 || Mount Lemmon || Mount Lemmon Survey ||  || align=right | 2.9 km || 
|-id=800 bgcolor=#E9E9E9
| 519800 ||  || — || October 17, 1998 || Kitt Peak || Spacewatch ||  || align=right | 2.0 km || 
|}

519801–519900 

|-bgcolor=#d6d6d6
| 519801 ||  || — || November 11, 2010 || Kitt Peak || Spacewatch ||  || align=right | 2.3 km || 
|-id=802 bgcolor=#E9E9E9
| 519802 ||  || — || November 2, 2010 || Mount Lemmon || Mount Lemmon Survey ||  || align=right | 1.1 km || 
|-id=803 bgcolor=#d6d6d6
| 519803 ||  || — || March 13, 2007 || Kitt Peak || Spacewatch ||  || align=right | 2.2 km || 
|-id=804 bgcolor=#E9E9E9
| 519804 ||  || — || September 5, 2010 || Mount Lemmon || Mount Lemmon Survey ||  || align=right data-sort-value="0.86" | 860 m || 
|-id=805 bgcolor=#fefefe
| 519805 ||  || — || August 30, 2011 || Haleakala || Pan-STARRS || H || align=right data-sort-value="0.59" | 590 m || 
|-id=806 bgcolor=#d6d6d6
| 519806 ||  || — || December 28, 2011 || Mount Lemmon || Mount Lemmon Survey ||  || align=right | 2.8 km || 
|-id=807 bgcolor=#d6d6d6
| 519807 ||  || — || April 9, 2013 || Haleakala || Pan-STARRS ||  || align=right | 1.9 km || 
|-id=808 bgcolor=#d6d6d6
| 519808 ||  || — || April 9, 2013 || Haleakala || Pan-STARRS ||  || align=right | 2.3 km || 
|-id=809 bgcolor=#E9E9E9
| 519809 ||  || — || September 18, 2010 || Kitt Peak || Spacewatch ||  || align=right | 1.9 km || 
|-id=810 bgcolor=#d6d6d6
| 519810 ||  || — || April 8, 2013 || Mount Lemmon || Mount Lemmon Survey ||  || align=right | 2.7 km || 
|-id=811 bgcolor=#d6d6d6
| 519811 ||  || — || September 5, 2010 || Mount Lemmon || Mount Lemmon Survey ||  || align=right | 2.6 km || 
|-id=812 bgcolor=#d6d6d6
| 519812 ||  || — || February 28, 2008 || Kitt Peak || Spacewatch ||  || align=right | 1.7 km || 
|-id=813 bgcolor=#d6d6d6
| 519813 ||  || — || April 10, 2013 || Haleakala || Pan-STARRS || BRA || align=right data-sort-value="0.89" | 890 m || 
|-id=814 bgcolor=#d6d6d6
| 519814 ||  || — || August 12, 2010 || Kitt Peak || Spacewatch ||  || align=right | 2.1 km || 
|-id=815 bgcolor=#E9E9E9
| 519815 ||  || — || October 2, 2006 || Kitt Peak || Spacewatch ||  || align=right | 1.2 km || 
|-id=816 bgcolor=#E9E9E9
| 519816 ||  || — || September 26, 2005 || Kitt Peak || Spacewatch ||  || align=right | 2.1 km || 
|-id=817 bgcolor=#d6d6d6
| 519817 ||  || — || November 12, 2005 || Kitt Peak || Spacewatch ||  || align=right | 2.4 km || 
|-id=818 bgcolor=#d6d6d6
| 519818 ||  || — || January 26, 2012 || Mount Lemmon || Mount Lemmon Survey ||  || align=right | 2.3 km || 
|-id=819 bgcolor=#E9E9E9
| 519819 ||  || — || June 13, 2005 || Mount Lemmon || Mount Lemmon Survey ||  || align=right | 1.3 km || 
|-id=820 bgcolor=#d6d6d6
| 519820 ||  || — || April 19, 2013 || Haleakala || Pan-STARRS ||  || align=right | 2.4 km || 
|-id=821 bgcolor=#d6d6d6
| 519821 ||  || — || January 26, 2012 || Mount Lemmon || Mount Lemmon Survey ||  || align=right | 2.6 km || 
|-id=822 bgcolor=#d6d6d6
| 519822 ||  || — || May 12, 2007 || Mount Lemmon || Mount Lemmon Survey ||  || align=right | 3.6 km || 
|-id=823 bgcolor=#fefefe
| 519823 ||  || — || April 17, 2013 || Haleakala || Pan-STARRS || H || align=right data-sort-value="0.41" | 410 m || 
|-id=824 bgcolor=#FFC2E0
| 519824 ||  || — || May 13, 2013 || Catalina || CSS || APO || align=right data-sort-value="0.49" | 490 m || 
|-id=825 bgcolor=#d6d6d6
| 519825 ||  || — || April 29, 2008 || Mount Lemmon || Mount Lemmon Survey ||  || align=right | 2.4 km || 
|-id=826 bgcolor=#E9E9E9
| 519826 ||  || — || November 20, 2006 || Kitt Peak || Spacewatch ||  || align=right | 1.7 km || 
|-id=827 bgcolor=#d6d6d6
| 519827 ||  || — || May 15, 2013 || Haleakala || Pan-STARRS ||  || align=right | 2.6 km || 
|-id=828 bgcolor=#d6d6d6
| 519828 ||  || — || May 15, 2013 || Haleakala || Pan-STARRS ||  || align=right | 2.5 km || 
|-id=829 bgcolor=#d6d6d6
| 519829 ||  || — || October 11, 2009 || Mount Lemmon || Mount Lemmon Survey ||  || align=right | 2.5 km || 
|-id=830 bgcolor=#d6d6d6
| 519830 ||  || — || May 15, 2013 || Haleakala || Pan-STARRS ||  || align=right | 2.1 km || 
|-id=831 bgcolor=#d6d6d6
| 519831 ||  || — || May 15, 2013 || Haleakala || Pan-STARRS ||  || align=right | 2.6 km || 
|-id=832 bgcolor=#d6d6d6
| 519832 ||  || — || May 15, 2013 || Haleakala || Pan-STARRS ||  || align=right | 2.1 km || 
|-id=833 bgcolor=#d6d6d6
| 519833 ||  || — || October 23, 2009 || Kitt Peak || Spacewatch ||  || align=right | 2.3 km || 
|-id=834 bgcolor=#d6d6d6
| 519834 ||  || — || May 16, 2013 || Haleakala || Pan-STARRS ||  || align=right | 3.2 km || 
|-id=835 bgcolor=#d6d6d6
| 519835 ||  || — || March 12, 2007 || Mount Lemmon || Mount Lemmon Survey ||  || align=right | 3.2 km || 
|-id=836 bgcolor=#d6d6d6
| 519836 ||  || — || January 29, 2010 || WISE || WISE ||  || align=right | 3.7 km || 
|-id=837 bgcolor=#fefefe
| 519837 ||  || — || December 17, 2001 || Socorro || LINEAR || H || align=right data-sort-value="0.56" | 560 m || 
|-id=838 bgcolor=#d6d6d6
| 519838 ||  || — || February 5, 2010 || WISE || WISE ||  || align=right | 3.1 km || 
|-id=839 bgcolor=#E9E9E9
| 519839 ||  || — || June 2, 2013 || Kitt Peak || Spacewatch ||  || align=right | 2.4 km || 
|-id=840 bgcolor=#fefefe
| 519840 ||  || — || May 15, 2013 || Haleakala || Pan-STARRS || H || align=right data-sort-value="0.49" | 490 m || 
|-id=841 bgcolor=#d6d6d6
| 519841 ||  || — || November 27, 2010 || Mount Lemmon || Mount Lemmon Survey ||  || align=right | 2.1 km || 
|-id=842 bgcolor=#d6d6d6
| 519842 ||  || — || May 15, 2013 || Haleakala || Pan-STARRS ||  || align=right | 2.9 km || 
|-id=843 bgcolor=#E9E9E9
| 519843 ||  || — || March 1, 2004 || Kitt Peak || Spacewatch ||  || align=right | 1.6 km || 
|-id=844 bgcolor=#E9E9E9
| 519844 ||  || — || April 6, 2008 || Mount Lemmon || Mount Lemmon Survey ||  || align=right | 1.5 km || 
|-id=845 bgcolor=#E9E9E9
| 519845 ||  || — || April 26, 2008 || Kitt Peak || Spacewatch ||  || align=right | 1.6 km || 
|-id=846 bgcolor=#d6d6d6
| 519846 ||  || — || April 14, 2007 || Kitt Peak || Spacewatch ||  || align=right | 2.7 km || 
|-id=847 bgcolor=#fefefe
| 519847 ||  || — || October 23, 2011 || Haleakala || Pan-STARRS || H || align=right data-sort-value="0.76" | 760 m || 
|-id=848 bgcolor=#E9E9E9
| 519848 ||  || — || June 17, 2009 || Mount Lemmon || Mount Lemmon Survey ||  || align=right | 1.0 km || 
|-id=849 bgcolor=#E9E9E9
| 519849 ||  || — || July 29, 2009 || Kitt Peak || Spacewatch ||  || align=right data-sort-value="0.94" | 940 m || 
|-id=850 bgcolor=#E9E9E9
| 519850 ||  || — || April 27, 2008 || Kitt Peak || Spacewatch ||  || align=right | 2.0 km || 
|-id=851 bgcolor=#d6d6d6
| 519851 ||  || — || January 31, 2006 || Kitt Peak || Spacewatch ||  || align=right | 2.2 km || 
|-id=852 bgcolor=#E9E9E9
| 519852 ||  || — || May 28, 2008 || Mount Lemmon || Mount Lemmon Survey ||  || align=right | 1.3 km || 
|-id=853 bgcolor=#d6d6d6
| 519853 ||  || — || October 9, 2008 || Mount Lemmon || Mount Lemmon Survey ||  || align=right | 3.5 km || 
|-id=854 bgcolor=#fefefe
| 519854 ||  || — || October 17, 2010 || Mount Lemmon || Mount Lemmon Survey ||  || align=right | 1.0 km || 
|-id=855 bgcolor=#E9E9E9
| 519855 ||  || — || June 20, 2013 || Haleakala || Pan-STARRS ||  || align=right | 1.1 km || 
|-id=856 bgcolor=#d6d6d6
| 519856 ||  || — || March 27, 2012 || Mount Lemmon || Mount Lemmon Survey ||  || align=right | 3.4 km || 
|-id=857 bgcolor=#E9E9E9
| 519857 ||  || — || February 27, 2012 || Haleakala || Pan-STARRS ||  || align=right data-sort-value="0.87" | 870 m || 
|-id=858 bgcolor=#d6d6d6
| 519858 ||  || — || February 26, 2012 || Haleakala || Pan-STARRS ||  || align=right | 2.2 km || 
|-id=859 bgcolor=#fefefe
| 519859 ||  || — || July 2, 2013 || Haleakala || Pan-STARRS ||  || align=right data-sort-value="0.71" | 710 m || 
|-id=860 bgcolor=#E9E9E9
| 519860 ||  || — || August 18, 2009 || Kitt Peak || Spacewatch ||  || align=right | 1.4 km || 
|-id=861 bgcolor=#d6d6d6
| 519861 ||  || — || July 2, 2013 || Haleakala || Pan-STARRS ||  || align=right | 3.0 km || 
|-id=862 bgcolor=#E9E9E9
| 519862 ||  || — || February 12, 2011 || Mount Lemmon || Mount Lemmon Survey ||  || align=right | 1.2 km || 
|-id=863 bgcolor=#E9E9E9
| 519863 ||  || — || July 13, 2013 || Haleakala || Pan-STARRS ||  || align=right | 1.2 km || 
|-id=864 bgcolor=#d6d6d6
| 519864 ||  || — || January 23, 2006 || Mount Lemmon || Mount Lemmon Survey ||  || align=right | 2.3 km || 
|-id=865 bgcolor=#E9E9E9
| 519865 ||  || — || July 14, 2013 || Haleakala || Pan-STARRS ||  || align=right data-sort-value="0.75" | 750 m || 
|-id=866 bgcolor=#fefefe
| 519866 ||  || — || July 14, 2013 || Haleakala || Pan-STARRS ||  || align=right data-sort-value="0.65" | 650 m || 
|-id=867 bgcolor=#E9E9E9
| 519867 ||  || — || July 14, 2013 || Haleakala || Pan-STARRS ||  || align=right data-sort-value="0.82" | 820 m || 
|-id=868 bgcolor=#E9E9E9
| 519868 ||  || — || April 27, 2012 || Haleakala || Pan-STARRS ||  || align=right | 1.1 km || 
|-id=869 bgcolor=#d6d6d6
| 519869 ||  || — || September 21, 2009 || Kitt Peak || Spacewatch ||  || align=right | 1.8 km || 
|-id=870 bgcolor=#d6d6d6
| 519870 ||  || — || September 5, 2008 || Kitt Peak || Spacewatch ||  || align=right | 3.4 km || 
|-id=871 bgcolor=#d6d6d6
| 519871 ||  || — || July 14, 2013 || Haleakala || Pan-STARRS || 7:4 || align=right | 3.3 km || 
|-id=872 bgcolor=#d6d6d6
| 519872 ||  || — || July 14, 2013 || Haleakala || Pan-STARRS ||  || align=right | 2.3 km || 
|-id=873 bgcolor=#E9E9E9
| 519873 ||  || — || July 14, 2013 || Haleakala || Pan-STARRS ||  || align=right | 1.4 km || 
|-id=874 bgcolor=#E9E9E9
| 519874 ||  || — || October 9, 2004 || Kitt Peak || Spacewatch ||  || align=right | 2.3 km || 
|-id=875 bgcolor=#d6d6d6
| 519875 ||  || — || July 14, 2013 || Haleakala || Pan-STARRS ||  || align=right | 3.0 km || 
|-id=876 bgcolor=#E9E9E9
| 519876 ||  || — || April 1, 2008 || Mount Lemmon || Mount Lemmon Survey ||  || align=right | 1.1 km || 
|-id=877 bgcolor=#d6d6d6
| 519877 ||  || — || January 30, 2011 || Haleakala || Pan-STARRS ||  || align=right | 2.7 km || 
|-id=878 bgcolor=#fefefe
| 519878 ||  || — || July 15, 2013 || Haleakala || Pan-STARRS ||  || align=right data-sort-value="0.54" | 540 m || 
|-id=879 bgcolor=#d6d6d6
| 519879 ||  || — || October 10, 2008 || Mount Lemmon || Mount Lemmon Survey ||  || align=right | 2.4 km || 
|-id=880 bgcolor=#d6d6d6
| 519880 ||  || — || October 24, 2009 || Kitt Peak || Spacewatch ||  || align=right | 1.8 km || 
|-id=881 bgcolor=#fefefe
| 519881 ||  || — || January 8, 2007 || Kitt Peak || Spacewatch || H || align=right data-sort-value="0.49" | 490 m || 
|-id=882 bgcolor=#fefefe
| 519882 ||  || — || January 27, 2007 || Mount Lemmon || Mount Lemmon Survey || H || align=right data-sort-value="0.67" | 670 m || 
|-id=883 bgcolor=#d6d6d6
| 519883 ||  || — || March 15, 2007 || Mount Lemmon || Mount Lemmon Survey ||  || align=right | 2.2 km || 
|-id=884 bgcolor=#d6d6d6
| 519884 ||  || — || July 16, 2013 || Haleakala || Pan-STARRS ||  || align=right | 2.7 km || 
|-id=885 bgcolor=#E9E9E9
| 519885 ||  || — || October 27, 2009 || Mount Lemmon || Mount Lemmon Survey ||  || align=right | 1.2 km || 
|-id=886 bgcolor=#E9E9E9
| 519886 ||  || — || July 16, 2013 || Haleakala || Pan-STARRS ||  || align=right | 1.4 km || 
|-id=887 bgcolor=#d6d6d6
| 519887 ||  || — || May 21, 2006 || Kitt Peak || Spacewatch ||  || align=right | 2.9 km || 
|-id=888 bgcolor=#d6d6d6
| 519888 ||  || — || July 18, 2013 || Haleakala || Pan-STARRS ||  || align=right | 2.7 km || 
|-id=889 bgcolor=#d6d6d6
| 519889 ||  || — || September 13, 2007 || Anderson Mesa || LONEOS ||  || align=right | 2.9 km || 
|-id=890 bgcolor=#d6d6d6
| 519890 ||  || — || December 17, 2003 || Kitt Peak || Spacewatch ||  || align=right | 2.7 km || 
|-id=891 bgcolor=#fefefe
| 519891 ||  || — || January 17, 2007 || Kitt Peak || Spacewatch ||  || align=right data-sort-value="0.99" | 990 m || 
|-id=892 bgcolor=#fefefe
| 519892 ||  || — || July 20, 2013 || Haleakala || Pan-STARRS ||  || align=right data-sort-value="0.92" | 920 m || 
|-id=893 bgcolor=#d6d6d6
| 519893 ||  || — || April 11, 2007 || Mount Lemmon || Mount Lemmon Survey ||  || align=right | 2.5 km || 
|-id=894 bgcolor=#FA8072
| 519894 ||  || — || August 8, 2013 || Haleakala || Pan-STARRS || H || align=right data-sort-value="0.55" | 550 m || 
|-id=895 bgcolor=#d6d6d6
| 519895 ||  || — || January 30, 2011 || Haleakala || Pan-STARRS ||  || align=right | 2.9 km || 
|-id=896 bgcolor=#fefefe
| 519896 ||  || — || February 10, 2008 || Mount Lemmon || Mount Lemmon Survey ||  || align=right | 1.1 km || 
|-id=897 bgcolor=#fefefe
| 519897 ||  || — || March 14, 2012 || Mount Lemmon || Mount Lemmon Survey ||  || align=right data-sort-value="0.63" | 630 m || 
|-id=898 bgcolor=#d6d6d6
| 519898 ||  || — || July 30, 2008 || Kitt Peak || Spacewatch ||  || align=right | 3.3 km || 
|-id=899 bgcolor=#d6d6d6
| 519899 ||  || — || February 4, 2005 || Kitt Peak || Spacewatch ||  || align=right | 2.8 km || 
|-id=900 bgcolor=#E9E9E9
| 519900 ||  || — || February 26, 2012 || Mount Lemmon || Mount Lemmon Survey ||  || align=right | 1.6 km || 
|}

519901–520000 

|-bgcolor=#d6d6d6
| 519901 ||  || — || April 25, 2006 || Kitt Peak || Spacewatch ||  || align=right | 2.6 km || 
|-id=902 bgcolor=#fefefe
| 519902 ||  || — || October 17, 2010 || Mount Lemmon || Mount Lemmon Survey ||  || align=right data-sort-value="0.81" | 810 m || 
|-id=903 bgcolor=#E9E9E9
| 519903 ||  || — || April 6, 2008 || Kitt Peak || Spacewatch ||  || align=right data-sort-value="0.86" | 860 m || 
|-id=904 bgcolor=#E9E9E9
| 519904 ||  || — || March 20, 2007 || Kitt Peak || Spacewatch ||  || align=right | 2.1 km || 
|-id=905 bgcolor=#fefefe
| 519905 ||  || — || August 14, 2013 || Haleakala || Pan-STARRS ||  || align=right data-sort-value="0.69" | 690 m || 
|-id=906 bgcolor=#E9E9E9
| 519906 ||  || — || October 14, 2009 || Mount Lemmon || Mount Lemmon Survey ||  || align=right | 1.1 km || 
|-id=907 bgcolor=#d6d6d6
| 519907 ||  || — || September 5, 2008 || Kitt Peak || Spacewatch ||  || align=right | 2.9 km || 
|-id=908 bgcolor=#d6d6d6
| 519908 ||  || — || March 14, 2011 || Mount Lemmon || Mount Lemmon Survey ||  || align=right | 2.1 km || 
|-id=909 bgcolor=#fefefe
| 519909 ||  || — || August 8, 2013 || Haleakala || Pan-STARRS ||  || align=right | 1.0 km || 
|-id=910 bgcolor=#E9E9E9
| 519910 ||  || — || September 15, 2009 || Kitt Peak || Spacewatch ||  || align=right | 1.4 km || 
|-id=911 bgcolor=#E9E9E9
| 519911 ||  || — || October 1, 2005 || Catalina || CSS ||  || align=right | 1.1 km || 
|-id=912 bgcolor=#fefefe
| 519912 ||  || — || January 4, 2011 || Mount Lemmon || Mount Lemmon Survey ||  || align=right data-sort-value="0.64" | 640 m || 
|-id=913 bgcolor=#fefefe
| 519913 ||  || — || August 28, 2006 || Kitt Peak || Spacewatch ||  || align=right data-sort-value="0.83" | 830 m || 
|-id=914 bgcolor=#fefefe
| 519914 ||  || — || August 15, 2013 || Haleakala || Pan-STARRS || H || align=right data-sort-value="0.42" | 420 m || 
|-id=915 bgcolor=#E9E9E9
| 519915 ||  || — || October 8, 2004 || Kitt Peak || Spacewatch ||  || align=right | 2.1 km || 
|-id=916 bgcolor=#fefefe
| 519916 ||  || — || September 1, 2013 || Mount Lemmon || Mount Lemmon Survey ||  || align=right data-sort-value="0.72" | 720 m || 
|-id=917 bgcolor=#E9E9E9
| 519917 ||  || — || October 14, 2009 || La Sagra || OAM Obs. ||  || align=right | 1.6 km || 
|-id=918 bgcolor=#d6d6d6
| 519918 ||  || — || March 5, 2011 || Mount Lemmon || Mount Lemmon Survey ||  || align=right | 3.1 km || 
|-id=919 bgcolor=#fefefe
| 519919 ||  || — || January 2, 2011 || Mount Lemmon || Mount Lemmon Survey ||  || align=right data-sort-value="0.69" | 690 m || 
|-id=920 bgcolor=#fefefe
| 519920 ||  || — || January 23, 2011 || Mount Lemmon || Mount Lemmon Survey ||  || align=right data-sort-value="0.67" | 670 m || 
|-id=921 bgcolor=#E9E9E9
| 519921 ||  || — || March 26, 2007 || Kitt Peak || Spacewatch ||  || align=right | 1.5 km || 
|-id=922 bgcolor=#E9E9E9
| 519922 ||  || — || September 5, 2013 || Kitt Peak || Spacewatch ||  || align=right | 1.1 km || 
|-id=923 bgcolor=#E9E9E9
| 519923 ||  || — || September 6, 2013 || Kitt Peak || Spacewatch ||  || align=right | 2.1 km || 
|-id=924 bgcolor=#E9E9E9
| 519924 ||  || — || August 22, 2004 || Kitt Peak || Spacewatch ||  || align=right | 1.3 km || 
|-id=925 bgcolor=#d6d6d6
| 519925 ||  || — || September 4, 2007 || Mount Lemmon || Mount Lemmon Survey ||  || align=right | 2.4 km || 
|-id=926 bgcolor=#E9E9E9
| 519926 ||  || — || September 6, 2013 || Kitt Peak || Spacewatch ||  || align=right data-sort-value="0.84" | 840 m || 
|-id=927 bgcolor=#E9E9E9
| 519927 ||  || — || September 6, 2013 || Kitt Peak || Spacewatch ||  || align=right | 2.0 km || 
|-id=928 bgcolor=#E9E9E9
| 519928 ||  || — || September 6, 2013 || Kitt Peak || Spacewatch ||  || align=right | 1.3 km || 
|-id=929 bgcolor=#E9E9E9
| 519929 ||  || — || October 11, 2004 || Kitt Peak || Spacewatch ||  || align=right | 1.9 km || 
|-id=930 bgcolor=#fefefe
| 519930 ||  || — || November 14, 2006 || Mount Lemmon || Mount Lemmon Survey ||  || align=right data-sort-value="0.67" | 670 m || 
|-id=931 bgcolor=#E9E9E9
| 519931 ||  || — || September 2, 2013 || Catalina || CSS ||  || align=right data-sort-value="0.92" | 920 m || 
|-id=932 bgcolor=#E9E9E9
| 519932 ||  || — || September 12, 2013 || Mount Lemmon || Mount Lemmon Survey ||  || align=right | 1.3 km || 
|-id=933 bgcolor=#E9E9E9
| 519933 ||  || — || January 9, 2006 || Kitt Peak || Spacewatch ||  || align=right | 1.4 km || 
|-id=934 bgcolor=#d6d6d6
| 519934 ||  || — || March 27, 2012 || Kitt Peak || Spacewatch ||  || align=right | 2.5 km || 
|-id=935 bgcolor=#E9E9E9
| 519935 ||  || — || March 29, 2012 || Kitt Peak || Spacewatch ||  || align=right | 2.4 km || 
|-id=936 bgcolor=#fefefe
| 519936 ||  || — || September 1, 2013 || Mount Lemmon || Mount Lemmon Survey ||  || align=right data-sort-value="0.55" | 550 m || 
|-id=937 bgcolor=#E9E9E9
| 519937 ||  || — || September 13, 2013 || Mount Lemmon || Mount Lemmon Survey ||  || align=right | 1.6 km || 
|-id=938 bgcolor=#E9E9E9
| 519938 ||  || — || September 13, 2013 || Mount Lemmon || Mount Lemmon Survey ||  || align=right | 1.2 km || 
|-id=939 bgcolor=#E9E9E9
| 519939 ||  || — || August 21, 2004 || Kitt Peak || Spacewatch ||  || align=right data-sort-value="0.95" | 950 m || 
|-id=940 bgcolor=#E9E9E9
| 519940 ||  || — || September 14, 2013 || Mount Lemmon || Mount Lemmon Survey ||  || align=right | 1.1 km || 
|-id=941 bgcolor=#E9E9E9
| 519941 ||  || — || October 2, 2008 || Kitt Peak || Spacewatch ||  || align=right | 2.1 km || 
|-id=942 bgcolor=#E9E9E9
| 519942 ||  || — || September 14, 2013 || Mount Lemmon || Mount Lemmon Survey ||  || align=right | 1.1 km || 
|-id=943 bgcolor=#E9E9E9
| 519943 ||  || — || September 14, 2013 || Haleakala || Pan-STARRS ||  || align=right | 1.2 km || 
|-id=944 bgcolor=#E9E9E9
| 519944 ||  || — || September 14, 2013 || Haleakala || Pan-STARRS ||  || align=right data-sort-value="0.81" | 810 m || 
|-id=945 bgcolor=#fefefe
| 519945 ||  || — || December 1, 2006 || Mount Lemmon || Mount Lemmon Survey ||  || align=right data-sort-value="0.86" | 860 m || 
|-id=946 bgcolor=#E9E9E9
| 519946 ||  || — || September 13, 2013 || Catalina || CSS ||  || align=right | 1.1 km || 
|-id=947 bgcolor=#d6d6d6
| 519947 ||  || — || November 7, 2007 || Kitt Peak || Spacewatch || 7:4 || align=right | 3.2 km || 
|-id=948 bgcolor=#E9E9E9
| 519948 ||  || — || September 11, 2004 || Kitt Peak || Spacewatch ||  || align=right data-sort-value="0.99" | 990 m || 
|-id=949 bgcolor=#fefefe
| 519949 ||  || — || September 17, 2013 || Mount Lemmon || Mount Lemmon Survey ||  || align=right data-sort-value="0.90" | 900 m || 
|-id=950 bgcolor=#d6d6d6
| 519950 ||  || — || September 14, 2007 || Kitt Peak || Spacewatch ||  || align=right | 2.6 km || 
|-id=951 bgcolor=#d6d6d6
| 519951 ||  || — || February 4, 2011 || Haleakala || Pan-STARRS ||  || align=right | 2.7 km || 
|-id=952 bgcolor=#d6d6d6
| 519952 ||  || — || February 17, 2010 || Kitt Peak || Spacewatch ||  || align=right | 2.7 km || 
|-id=953 bgcolor=#fefefe
| 519953 ||  || — || March 16, 2012 || Haleakala || Pan-STARRS ||  || align=right data-sort-value="0.75" | 750 m || 
|-id=954 bgcolor=#E9E9E9
| 519954 ||  || — || September 17, 2013 || Mount Lemmon || Mount Lemmon Survey ||  || align=right | 1.6 km || 
|-id=955 bgcolor=#d6d6d6
| 519955 ||  || — || September 17, 2013 || Mount Lemmon || Mount Lemmon Survey ||  || align=right | 3.1 km || 
|-id=956 bgcolor=#d6d6d6
| 519956 ||  || — || November 18, 2008 || Kitt Peak || Spacewatch ||  || align=right | 2.2 km || 
|-id=957 bgcolor=#E9E9E9
| 519957 ||  || — || September 28, 2013 || Mount Lemmon || Mount Lemmon Survey ||  || align=right | 1.5 km || 
|-id=958 bgcolor=#E9E9E9
| 519958 ||  || — || September 28, 2013 || Mount Lemmon || Mount Lemmon Survey ||  || align=right | 1.7 km || 
|-id=959 bgcolor=#E9E9E9
| 519959 ||  || — || September 15, 2013 || Catalina || CSS ||  || align=right | 1.6 km || 
|-id=960 bgcolor=#d6d6d6
| 519960 ||  || — || October 24, 2008 || Kitt Peak || Spacewatch ||  || align=right | 2.0 km || 
|-id=961 bgcolor=#E9E9E9
| 519961 ||  || — || January 30, 2011 || Haleakala || Pan-STARRS ||  || align=right | 1.9 km || 
|-id=962 bgcolor=#fefefe
| 519962 ||  || — || October 7, 2013 || Mount Lemmon || Mount Lemmon Survey || H || align=right data-sort-value="0.46" | 460 m || 
|-id=963 bgcolor=#E9E9E9
| 519963 ||  || — || April 6, 2008 || Kitt Peak || Spacewatch ||  || align=right data-sort-value="0.71" | 710 m || 
|-id=964 bgcolor=#fefefe
| 519964 ||  || — || January 23, 2011 || Mount Lemmon || Mount Lemmon Survey ||  || align=right data-sort-value="0.87" | 870 m || 
|-id=965 bgcolor=#E9E9E9
| 519965 ||  || — || January 30, 2006 || Kitt Peak || Spacewatch ||  || align=right | 2.1 km || 
|-id=966 bgcolor=#E9E9E9
| 519966 ||  || — || November 26, 2009 || Kitt Peak || Spacewatch ||  || align=right | 1.0 km || 
|-id=967 bgcolor=#E9E9E9
| 519967 ||  || — || March 13, 2007 || Kitt Peak || Spacewatch ||  || align=right | 1.4 km || 
|-id=968 bgcolor=#E9E9E9
| 519968 ||  || — || October 2, 2013 || Kitt Peak || Spacewatch ||  || align=right | 1.5 km || 
|-id=969 bgcolor=#E9E9E9
| 519969 ||  || — || March 29, 2012 || Mount Lemmon || Mount Lemmon Survey ||  || align=right | 1.3 km || 
|-id=970 bgcolor=#d6d6d6
| 519970 ||  || — || September 3, 2013 || Kitt Peak || Spacewatch ||  || align=right | 3.3 km || 
|-id=971 bgcolor=#d6d6d6
| 519971 ||  || — || October 2, 2013 || Kitt Peak || Spacewatch ||  || align=right | 2.3 km || 
|-id=972 bgcolor=#E9E9E9
| 519972 ||  || — || October 3, 2013 || Kitt Peak || Spacewatch ||  || align=right | 2.1 km || 
|-id=973 bgcolor=#fefefe
| 519973 ||  || — || October 2, 2006 || Mount Lemmon || Mount Lemmon Survey ||  || align=right data-sort-value="0.59" | 590 m || 
|-id=974 bgcolor=#E9E9E9
| 519974 ||  || — || September 7, 2008 || Mount Lemmon || Mount Lemmon Survey ||  || align=right | 1.6 km || 
|-id=975 bgcolor=#E9E9E9
| 519975 ||  || — || October 3, 2013 || Mount Lemmon || Mount Lemmon Survey ||  || align=right data-sort-value="0.73" | 730 m || 
|-id=976 bgcolor=#E9E9E9
| 519976 ||  || — || October 13, 2005 || Kitt Peak || Spacewatch ||  || align=right data-sort-value="0.57" | 570 m || 
|-id=977 bgcolor=#d6d6d6
| 519977 ||  || — || October 3, 2013 || Kitt Peak || Spacewatch ||  || align=right | 2.8 km || 
|-id=978 bgcolor=#E9E9E9
| 519978 ||  || — || September 3, 2008 || Kitt Peak || Spacewatch ||  || align=right | 2.0 km || 
|-id=979 bgcolor=#E9E9E9
| 519979 ||  || — || September 7, 2008 || Mount Lemmon || Mount Lemmon Survey ||  || align=right | 1.6 km || 
|-id=980 bgcolor=#E9E9E9
| 519980 ||  || — || October 3, 2013 || Haleakala || Pan-STARRS ||  || align=right | 1.6 km || 
|-id=981 bgcolor=#E9E9E9
| 519981 ||  || — || March 13, 2011 || Kitt Peak || Spacewatch ||  || align=right | 2.4 km || 
|-id=982 bgcolor=#E9E9E9
| 519982 ||  || — || February 25, 2006 || Kitt Peak || Spacewatch ||  || align=right | 1.8 km || 
|-id=983 bgcolor=#E9E9E9
| 519983 ||  || — || October 3, 2013 || Haleakala || Pan-STARRS ||  || align=right | 1.9 km || 
|-id=984 bgcolor=#E9E9E9
| 519984 ||  || — || October 3, 2013 || Haleakala || Pan-STARRS ||  || align=right | 1.1 km || 
|-id=985 bgcolor=#E9E9E9
| 519985 ||  || — || September 22, 2009 || Mount Lemmon || Mount Lemmon Survey ||  || align=right data-sort-value="0.99" | 990 m || 
|-id=986 bgcolor=#d6d6d6
| 519986 ||  || — || October 3, 2013 || Haleakala || Pan-STARRS ||  || align=right | 2.4 km || 
|-id=987 bgcolor=#E9E9E9
| 519987 ||  || — || May 21, 2012 || Haleakala || Pan-STARRS ||  || align=right data-sort-value="0.87" | 870 m || 
|-id=988 bgcolor=#E9E9E9
| 519988 ||  || — || September 26, 2013 || Mount Lemmon || Mount Lemmon Survey ||  || align=right | 1.0 km || 
|-id=989 bgcolor=#E9E9E9
| 519989 ||  || — || November 11, 2004 || Kitt Peak || Spacewatch ||  || align=right | 2.5 km || 
|-id=990 bgcolor=#E9E9E9
| 519990 ||  || — || October 5, 2013 || Kitt Peak || Spacewatch ||  || align=right | 1.5 km || 
|-id=991 bgcolor=#E9E9E9
| 519991 ||  || — || October 26, 2005 || Kitt Peak || Spacewatch ||  || align=right data-sort-value="0.64" | 640 m || 
|-id=992 bgcolor=#E9E9E9
| 519992 ||  || — || October 5, 2013 || Kitt Peak || Spacewatch ||  || align=right | 1.3 km || 
|-id=993 bgcolor=#E9E9E9
| 519993 ||  || — || May 19, 2012 || Mount Lemmon || Mount Lemmon Survey ||  || align=right data-sort-value="0.93" | 930 m || 
|-id=994 bgcolor=#fefefe
| 519994 ||  || — || September 22, 2009 || Kitt Peak || Spacewatch ||  || align=right data-sort-value="0.62" | 620 m || 
|-id=995 bgcolor=#E9E9E9
| 519995 ||  || — || February 19, 2010 || Mount Lemmon || Mount Lemmon Survey ||  || align=right | 1.6 km || 
|-id=996 bgcolor=#d6d6d6
| 519996 ||  || — || October 5, 2013 || Haleakala || Pan-STARRS ||  || align=right | 1.8 km || 
|-id=997 bgcolor=#E9E9E9
| 519997 ||  || — || December 10, 2009 || Mount Lemmon || Mount Lemmon Survey ||  || align=right | 1.4 km || 
|-id=998 bgcolor=#E9E9E9
| 519998 ||  || — || August 7, 2008 || Kitt Peak || Spacewatch ||  || align=right | 1.9 km || 
|-id=999 bgcolor=#E9E9E9
| 519999 ||  || — || November 4, 2004 || Kitt Peak || Spacewatch ||  || align=right | 2.1 km || 
|-id=000 bgcolor=#d6d6d6
| 520000 ||  || — || October 20, 2008 || Kitt Peak || Spacewatch ||  || align=right | 2.9 km || 
|}

References

External links 
 Discovery Circumstances: Numbered Minor Planets (515001)–(520000) (IAU Minor Planet Center)

0519